A winning streak, also known as a win streak or hot streak, is an uninterrupted sequence of success in games or competitions, commonly measured by at least 2 wins that are uninterrupted by losses or ties/draws. In sports, it can be applied to teams, and individuals. In sports where teams or individuals represent groups such as countries or regions, those groups can also be said to have winning streaks if their representatives win consecutive games or competitions, even if the competitors are different. Streaks can also be applied to specific competitions: for example, a competitor who wins an event in three consecutive Olympic Games has an Olympic winning streak, even if they have lost other competitions during the period.

Longest streaks

The longest (in terms of time) recorded winning streak in any professional sports is Spain's Antoni Bou, having won 32 consecutive world championships in Motorcycle Trials between 2007 and today, he is still active in the sport. Pakistan's Jahangir Khan's 555 consecutive wins in squash from 1981 to 1986 is also of significant note. In 2013, the Dutch wheelchair tennis player Esther Vergeer retired with an active 10-year-long winning streak of 470 matches, including a streak of 250 consecutive sets won.

Air sports

Aerobatic

Team
3 consecutive titles at FAI World Aerobatic Championships – Russia
 Streak started 2001 Burgos, Spain
 Streak ended 2007 Burgos, Spain

Aquatic sports

Diving

Olympics

World Championships

Men's

1m Springboard
7 consecutive gold medals at World Championships – China
 Streak started 2007 Melbourne, Australia

3m Springboard
3 consecutive gold medals at World Championships
 Phil Boggs
 Streak started 1973 Belgrade, Yugoslavia
 Streak ended 1982 Guayaquil, Ecuador
 He Chong
 Streak started 2009 Rome, Italy
 Streak ended 2015 Kazan, Russia

7 consecutive gold medals at World Championships – China
 Streak started 2007 Melbourne, Australia

10m Platform
3 consecutive gold medals at World Championships
 Greg Louganis
 Streak started 1978 West Berlin
 Streak ended 1991 Perth, Australia
 Qiu Bo
 Streak started 2011 Shanghai, China
 Streak ended 2017 Budapest, Hungary

Synchronized 3m Springboard
5 consecutive gold medals at World Championships – China
 Streak started 2005 Montreal, Canada

Synchronized 10m Platform
3 consecutive gold medals at World Championships – United States
 Streak started 2007 Melbourne, Australia
 Streak ended 2013 Barcelona, Spain

Women's

3m Springboard
5 consecutive gold medals at World Championships – Guo Jingjing
 Streak started 2001 Fukuoka, Japan
 Streak ended 2011 Shanghai, China

10 consecutive gold medals at World Championships – China
 Streak started 2001 Fukuoka, Japan

10m Platform
3 consecutive gold medals at World Championships – China
 Streak started 1986 Madrid, Spain
 Streak ended 1998 Perth, Australia

Synchronized 3m Springboard
10 consecutive titles at World Championships – China
 Streak started 2001 Fukuoka, Japan

Synchronized 10m Platform
10 consecutive titles at World Championships – China
 Streak started 2001 Fukuoka, Japan

Swimming

Overall

Johnny Weissmuller

Weissmuller never lost a swimming race during his entire amateur career, including three individual Olympic gold medals. He is purported to have told the other swimmers in his Olympic final that they could fight it out for second place.

Tamás Darnyi

Darnyi was undefeated his entire international career in both the 200m and 400m Individual medley races, lasting from 1985 to 1993, though he did not hold the world record for the entirety of the period (another person broke it in a race that Darnyi did not compete in. He later reclaimed the record).

Roland Matthes

Matthes was undefeated in the 100 and 200 meter backstroke races from 1968–1974, though he lost the world record in races he did not compete in during that span. He later lost both records for good at the end of his career when he earned a bronze in the 100m backstroke behind John Naber, who also set the world record in the 200m backstroke.

Vladimir Salnikov

Salnikov won all 61 of his 1500m freestyle races from 1977 to 1986. The streak ended when he finished fourth at the 1986 FINA World Championships.

Olympics

World Championships (50m)

Men's

50m Freestyle
3 consecutive titles at FINA World Aquatics Championships – César Cielo
 Streak started 2009 Rome, Italy

400m Freestyle
3 consecutive titles at FINA World Aquatics Championships – Ian Thorpe
 Streak started 1998 Perth, Australia
 Streak ended 2005 Montreal, Canada

5 consecutive titles at FINA World Aquatics Championships – Australia
 Streak started 1994 Rome, Italy
 Streak ended 2007 Melbourne, Australia

1500m Freestyle
4 consecutive titles at FINA World Aquatics Championships – Grant Hackett
 Streak started 1998 Perth, Australia
 Streak ended 2007 Melbourne, Australia

5 consecutive titles at FINA World Aquatics Championships – Australia
 Streak started 1994 Rome, Italy
 Streak ended 2007 Melbourne, Australia

100m Backstroke
3 consecutive titles at FINA World Aquatics Championships – Aaron Peirsol
 Streak started 2003 Barcelona, Spain
 Streak ended 2009 Rome, Italy

3 consecutive titles at FINA World Aquatics Championships – United States
 Streak started 2003 Barcelona, Spain
 Streak ended 2009 Rome, Italy

200m Backstroke
3 consecutive titles at FINA World Aquatics Championships – Aaron Peirsol
 Streak started 2001 Fukuoka, Japan
 Streak ended 2007 Melbourne, Australia

8 consecutive titles at FINA World Aquatics Championships – United States
 Streak started 1998 Perth, Australia

200m Breaststroke
3 consecutive titles at FINA World Aquatics Championships – Dániel Gyurta
 Streak started 2009 Rome, Italy

3 consecutive titles at FINA World Aquatics Championships – Hungary
 Streak started 2009 Rome, Italy

100m Butterfly
3 consecutive titles at FINA World Aquatics Championships – Michael Phelps
 Streak started 2007 Melbourne, Australia
 Streak ended 2013 Barcelona, Spain

5 consecutive titles at FINA World Aquatics Championships – United States
 Streak started 2003 Barcelona, Spain
 Streak ended 2013 Barcelona, Spain

200m Butterfly
3 consecutive titles at FINA World Aquatics Championships – Michael Phelps
 Streak started 2007 Melbourne, Australia
 Streak ended 2013 Barcelona, Spain
Note: he also won in 2001 and 2003, but elected not to swim the race in the 2005 FINA World Championships.

3 consecutive titles at FINA World Aquatics Championships
 United States
 Streak started 1973 Belgrade, Yugoslavia
 Streak ended 1982 Guayaquil, Ecuador
 United States
 Streak started 2007 Melbourne, Australia
 Streak ended 2013 Barcelona, Spain

200m Individual Medley
3 consecutive titles at FINA World Aquatics Championships
 Michael Phelps
 Streak started 2003 Barcelona, Spain
 Streak ended 2009 Rome, Italy
 Ryan Lochte
 Streak started 2009 Rome, Italy

400m Individual Medley
3 consecutive titles at FINA World Aquatics Championships – United States
 Streak started 2007 Melbourne, Australia
 Streak ended 2013 Barcelona, Spain

4 × 100 m Freestyle Relay
8 consecutive titles at World Championships – United States
 Streak started 1973 Belgrade, Yugoslavia
 Streak ended 2001 Fukuoka, Japan

4 × 200 m Freestyle Relay
5 consecutive titles at World Championships – United States
 Streak started 2005 Montreal, Canada

4 × 100 m Medley Relay
7 consecutive titles at World Championships – United States
 Streak started 1973 Belgrade, Yugoslavia
 Streak ended 1998 Perth, Australia

Women's

100m Freestyle
5 consecutive titles at World Championships – East Germany
 Streak started 1973 Belgrade, Yugoslavia
 Streak ended 1991 Perth, Australia

200m Freestyle
3 consecutive titles at World Championships – United States
 Streak started 1973 Belgrade, Yugoslavia
 Streak ended 1982 Guayaquil, Ecuador

800m Freestyle
3 consecutive titles at World Championships – United States
 Streak started 1991 Perth, Australia
 Streak ended 2001 Fukuoka, Japan

200m Individual Medley
3 consecutive titles at FINA World Aquatics Championships
 China
 Streak started 1991 Perth, Australia
 Streak ended 2001 Fukuoka, Japan
 United States
 Streak started 2005 Montreal, Canada
 Streak ended 2011 Shanghai, China

400m Individual Medley
3 consecutive titles at FINA World Aquatics Championships – China
 Streak started 1991 Perth, Australia
 Streak ended 2001 Fukuoka, Japan

4 × 200 m Freestyle Relay
3 consecutive titles at FINA World Aquatics Championships – United States
 Streak started 2003 Barcelona, Spain
 Streak ended 2009 Rome, Italy

World Championships (25m)

Men's

400m Freestyle
3 consecutive titles at World Championships – Yuri Prilukov
 Streak started 2004 Indianapolis, United States
 Streak ended 2010 Dubai, United Arab Emeirates

3 consecutive titles at World Championships – Russia
 Streak started 2004 Indianapolis, United States
 Streak ended 2010 Dubai, United Arab Emeirates

1500m Freestyle
3 consecutive titles at World Championships – Yuri Prilukov
 Streak started 2004 Indianapolis, United States
 Streak ended 2010 Dubai, United Arab Emeirates

4 consecutive titles at World Championships – Australia
 Streak started 1993 Palma de Mallorca, Spain
 Streak ended 2000 Athens, Greece

100m Backstroke
3 consecutive titles at World Championships – Cuba
 Streak started 1995 Rio de Janeiro, Brazil
 Streak ended 2000 Athens, Greece

200m Backstroke
3 consecutive titles at World Championships – United States
 Streak started 2002 Moscow, Russia
 Streak ended 2008 Manchester, United Kingdom

100m Butterfly
3 consecutive titles at World Championships – Lars Frölander
 Streak started 1997 Gothenburg, Sweden
 Streak ended 2002 Moscow, Russia

3 consecutive titles at World Championships – Sweden
 Streak started 1997 Gothenburg, Sweden
 Streak ended 2002 Moscow, Russia

200m Butterfly
5 consecutive titles at World Championships – James Hickman
 Streak started 1997 Gothenburg, Sweden
 Streak ended 2006 Shanghai, China

5 consecutive titles at World Championships – United Kingdom
 Streak started 1997 Gothenburg, Sweden
 Streak ended 2006 Shanghai, China

100m Individual Medley
3 consecutive titles at World Championships – Ryan Lochte
 Streak started 2008 Manchester, United Kingdom

3 consecutive titles at World Championships – United States
 Streak started 2008 Manchester, United Kingdom

200m Individual Medley
4 consecutive titles at World Championships – Ryan Lochte
 Streak started 2006 Shanghai, China

4 consecutive titles at World Championships – United States
 Streak started 2006 Shanghai, China

400m Individual Medley
3 consecutive titles at World Championships
 Matthew Dunn
 Streak started 1995 Rio de Janeiro, Brazil
 Streak ended 2000 Athens, Greece
 Ryan Lochte
 Streak started 2006 Shanghai, China
 Streak ended 2012 2012 Istanbul, Turkey

3 consecutive titles at World Championships
 Australia
 Streak started 1995 Rio de Janeiro, Brazil
 Streak ended 2000 Athens, Greece
 United States
 Streak started 2006 Shanghai, China
 Streak ended 2012 2012 Istanbul, Turkey

4 × 100 m Medley Relay
3 consecutive titles at World Championships – United States
 Streak started 2000 Athens, Greece
 Streak ended 2006 Shanghai, China

Women's

800m Freestyle
3 consecutive titles at World Championships – Chen Hua
 Streak started 1999 Hong Kong, China
 Streak ended 2004 Indianapolis, United States

3 consecutive titles at World Championships – China
 Streak started 1999 Hong Kong, China
 Streak ended 2004 Indianapolis, United States

200m Backstroke
3 consecutive titles at World Championships – United States
 Streak started 2002 Moscow, Russia
 Streak ended 2008 Manchester, United Kingdom

100m Breaststroke
3 consecutive titles at World Championships – United States
 Streak started 2006 Shanghai, China
 Streak ended 2012 Istanbul, Turkey

100m Butterfly
3 consecutive titles at World Championships – Jenny Thompson
 Streak started 1997 Gothenburg, Sweden
 Streak ended 2002 Moscow, Russia

3 consecutive titles at World Championships
 United States
 Streak started 1997 Gothenburg, Sweden
 Streak ended 2002 Moscow, Russia
 Australia
 Streak started 2006 Shanghai, China
 Streak ended 2012 Istanbul, Turkey

100m Individual Medley
3 consecutive titles at World Championships – Martina Moravcová
 Streak started 1999 Hong Kong, China
 Streak ended 2004 Indianapolis, United States

3 consecutive titles at World Championships
 Slovakia
 Streak started 1999 Hong Kong, China
 Streak ended 2004 Indianapolis, United States
 Australia
 Streak started 2004 Indianapolis, United States
 Streak ended 2010 Dubai, United Arab Emirates

400m Individual Medley
3 consecutive titles at World Championships – Yana Klochkova
 Streak started 1999 Hong Kong, China
 Streak ended 2004 Indianapolis, United States

3 consecutive titles at World Championships – Ukraine
 Streak started 1999 Hong Kong, China
 Streak ended 2004 Indianapolis, United States

4 × 100 m Freestyle Relay
3 consecutive titles at World Championships
 China
 Streak started 1993 Palma de Mallorca, Spain
 Streak ended 1999 Hong Kong, China
 Netherlands
 Streak started 2006 Shanghai, China
 Streak ended 2012 Istanbul, Turkey

College (United States)
31 consecutive NCAA Men's Division III titles – Kenyon College
 Streak started 1980 Washington, Pennsylvania
 Streak ended 2011 Knoxville, Tennessee

45-year consecutive NJCAA National Championship wins by Indian River State College Men's Swimming and Diving (as of March in 2019)
37-year consecutive NJCAA National Championship wins by Indian River State College Women's Swimming and Diving (as of March in 2019)
Swimming World Presents the NAIA, NJCAA, D2, & D3 Championship Recaps

Synchronised swimming

FINA World Aquatics Championships

Team
8 consecutive gold medals at World Championships team titles – Russia
 Streak started 1998 Perth, Australia

Water polo

Men's
3 consecutive gold medals at Summer Olympics
 Great Britain
 Streak started 1908 London, United Kingdom
 Streak ended 1924 Paris, France
 Hungary
 Streak started 2000 Sydney, Australia
 Streak ended 2012 London, United Kingdom

Women's
3 consecutive gold medals at Summer Olympics
 United States
 Streak started 2012 London, United Kingdom

3 consecutive gold medals at World Aquatics Championships
 United States
 Streak started 2015 Kazan, Russia

Archery

Olympics

World Outdoor Championships

Men's

Recurve

Individual
4 consecutive titles at World Archery Championships – Hans Deutgen
 Streak started 1947 Prague, Czechoslovakia
 Streak ended 1952 Brussels, Belgium

7 consecutive titles at World Archery Championships – Sweden
 Streak started 1947 Prague, Czechoslovakia
 Streak ended 1957 Prague, Czechoslovakia

Team
13 consecutive titles at World Archery Championships – United States
 Streak started 1957 Stockholm, Sweden
 Streak ended 1985 Seoul, South Korea

Compound

Individual
3 consecutive titles at World Archery Championships – United States
 Streak started 1995 Jakarta, Indonesia
 Streak ended 2001 Beijing, China

Team
5 consecutive titles at World Archery Championships – United States
 Streak started 2003 New York, United States
 Streak ended 2013 Belek, Turkey

Women's

Recurve

Individual
5 consecutive titles at World Archery Championships – South Korea
 Streak started 1997 Victoria, Canada
 Streak ended 2007 Leipzig, Germany

Team
6 consecutive titles at World Archery Championships – United States
 Streak started 1959 Prague, Czechoslovakia
 Streak ended 1967 Amersfort, Netherlands

World Indoor Championships

Men's

Compound

Individual
5 consecutive titles at World Archery Championships
 United States
 Streak started 1991 Oulu, Finland
 Streak ended 2001 Florence, Italy
 United States
 Streak started 1991 Nîmes, France

Team
5 consecutive titles at World Archery Championships – United States
 Streak started 1991 Nîmes, France

Compound Junior

Team
4 consecutive titles at World Archery Championships – United States
 Streak started 2001 Florence, Italy
 Streak ended 2009 Rzeszów, Poland

Women's

Compound

Team
6 consecutive titles at World Archery Championships – United States
 Streak started 2001 Florence, Italy

Compound Junior

Team
3 consecutive titles at World Archery Championships – United States
 Streak started 2001 Florence, Italy
 Streak ended 2007 Izmir, Turkey

World Youth Championships

Men's

Compound Junior

Individual
4 consecutive titles at World Archery Championships – United States
 Streak started 1994 Roncegno, Italy
 Streak ended 2002 Nymburk, Czech Republic

Recurve Cadet

Individual
3 consecutive titles at World Archery Championships – South Korea
 Streak started 2008 Antalya, Turkey
 Streak ended 2013 Wuxi, China

Compound Cadet

Team
3 consecutive titles at World Archery Championships – United States
 Streak started 2002 Nymburk, Czech Republic
 Streak ended 2009 Ogden, United States

Women's

Recurve Junior

Individual
7 consecutive titles at World Archery Championships – South Korea
 Streak started 1994 Roncegno, Czech Republic
 Streak ended 2008 Antalya, Turkey

Team
3 consecutive titles at World Archery Championships – South Korea
 Streak started 2000 Belfort, France
 Streak ended 2008 Antalya, Turkey

Compound Junior

Individual
3 consecutive titles at World Archery Championships – United States
 Streak started 1996 Chula Vista, United States
 Streak ended 2002 Nymburk, Czech Republic

Team
5 consecutive titles at World Archery Championships – United States
 Streak started 2000 Belfort, France
 Streak ended 2011 Legnica, Poland

Recurve Cadet

Team
3 consecutive titles at World Archery Championships – South Korea
 Streak started 2008 Antalya, Turkey
 Streak ended 2013 Wuxi, China

Compound Cadet

Individual
3 consecutive titles at World Archery Championships – United States
 Streak started 2008 Antalya, Turkey
 Streak ended 2013 Wuxi, China

Team
5 consecutive titles at World Archery Championships – United States
 Streak started 2006 Mérida, Mexico

World Para Championships

Men's

Recurve

Team Open
4 consecutive titles at World Archery Championships – South Korea
 Streak started 2001 Nymburk, Czech Republic
 Streak ended 2009 Nymburk, Czech Republic

Individual Wheelchair/Visual Impairment
6 consecutive titles at World Archery Championships – South Korea
 Streak started 1998 Stoke Mandeville, United Kingdom
 Streak ended 2009 Nymburk, Czech Republic

Compound

Team Open
3 consecutive titles at World Archery Championships – South Korea
 Streak started 2005 Massa Carrara, Italy
 Streak ended 2011 Turin, Italy

Individual Wheelchair/Visual Impairment
3 consecutive titles at World Archery Championships
 Zdeněk Šebek
 Streak started 1998 Stoke Mandeville, United Kingdom
 Streak ended 2003 Madrid, Spain
 Jeffrey Rhoden Fabry
 Streak started 2003 Madrid, Spain
 Streak ended 2009 Nymburk, Czech Republic

3 consecutive titles at World Archery Championships
 Czech Republic
 Streak started 1998 Stoke Mandeville, United Kingdom
 Streak ended 2003 Madrid, Spain
 United States
 Streak started 2003 Madrid, Spain
 Streak ended 2009 Nymburk, Czech Republic

Women's

Recurve

Individual Wheelchair/Visual Impairment
3 consecutive titles at World Archery Championships – Italy
 Streak started 1999 Christchurch, New Zealand
 Streak ended 2005 Massa Carrara, Italy

Compound

Individual Open
3 consecutive titles at World Archery Championships – Danielle Brown
 Streak started 2007 Cheongju, South Korea
 Streak ended 2013 Bangkok, Thailand

4 consecutive titles at World Archery Championships – United Kingdom
 Streak started 2005 Massa Carrara, Italy
 Streak ended 2013 Bangkok, Thailand

World Field Championships

Men's

Recurve
4 consecutive titles at World Archery Championships
 United States
 Streak started 1969 Valley Forge, United States
 Streak ended 1976 Molndal, Sweden
 Sweden
 Streak started 1980 Palmerston North, New Zealand
 Streak ended 1988 Bolzano, Italy

Compound
3 consecutive titles at World Archery Championships – United States
 Streak started 2008 Llwynypia, United Kingdom

Barebow/Instinctive
3 consecutive titles at World Archery Championships – Anders Rosenberg
 Streak started 1978 Geneva, Switzerland
 Streak ended 1984 Hyvinkää, Finland

5 consecutive titles at World Archery Championships – Sweden
 Streak started 1978 Geneva, Switzerland
 Streak ended 1988 Bolzano, Italy

Team
3 consecutive titles at World Archery Championships – France
 Streak started 1994 Vertus, France
 Streak ended 2000 Cortina, Italy

Women's

Barebow/Instinctive
3 consecutive titles at World Archery Championships – Italy
 Streak started 1988 Bolzano, Italy
 Streak ended 1994 Vertus, France

Junior Women

Compound
3 consecutive titles at World Archery Championships – Sweden
 Streak started 2004 Plitvice, Croatia
 Streak ended 2010 Visegrád, Hungary

World University Championships

Men's

Recurve

Team
3 consecutive titles at World Archery Championships – Chinese Taipei
 Streak started 2004 Madrid, Spain
 Streak ended 2010 Shenzhen, China

Compound

Individual
4 consecutive titles at World Archery Championships – United States
 Streak started 2006 Viničné, Slovakia

Team
3 consecutive titles at World Archery Championships – United States
 Streak started 1998 Taoyuan, Chinese Taipei
 Streak ended 2004 Madrid, Spain

Women's

Recurve

Individual
3 consecutive titles at World Archery Championships – South Korea
 Streak started 2008 Tainan, Chinese Taipei

Team
3 consecutive titles at World Archery Championships – South Korea
 Streak started 2008 Tainan, Chinese Taipei

Compound

Individual
3 consecutive titles at World Archery Championships – United States
 Streak started 2000 Madrid, Spain
 Streak ended 2006 Viničné, Slovakia

Team
3 consecutive titles at World Archery Championships – United States
 Streak started 2000 Madrid, Spain
 Streak ended 2006 Viničné, Slovakia

Mixed

Compound Team
4 consecutive titles at World Archery Championships – United States
 Streak started 2006 Viničné, Slovakia

Athletics

Overall

Men's 400m Hurdles
122 races – Edwin Moses
 Streak started September 2, 1977, Düsseldorf, West Germany
 Streak ended June 4, 1987, Madrid, Spain (second to Danny Harris)
Note: this streak included an Olympic gold medal and two improvements of his own world records.

Long-distance running
75 races – Emil Zátopek
 Streak started September 26, 1948 (10,000 m race in Bucharest)
 Streak ended July 11, 1951 (second place in a 3000 m race in Prague)

10 global titles - Mo Farah
 Streak started September 4, 2011 (5000 m final at 2011 World Championships in Daegu)
 Streak ended August 5, 2017 (silver medal in 5000m final at 2017 World Championships in London.)
 Streak included 6 World Championships and 4 Olympic Gold medals, and 2 "double-doubles" split evenly between 5000 and 10,000 metres, bookended by silver medals.

Men's Long Jump
65 consecutive competitions – Carl Lewis
 Ended by Mike Powell when he jumped his 8.95 m world record during the 1991 World Championships

Men's Cross Country
5 consecutive World Championships
 Paul Tergat
 Streak started 1995 Durham, United Kingdom
 Streak ended 2000 Vilamoura, Portugal
 Kenenisa Bekele
 Streak started 2002 Dublin, Ireland
 Streak ended 2007 Mombasa, Kenya

Women's high jump
140 to 150 competitions – Iolanda Balaş
 Streak started December 1956
 Streak ended June 1967
Note: this streak included 2 Olympic gold medals and 14 improvements of the world record.

Olympics

IAAF World Championships in Athletics

Men's

100m
3 consecutive gold medals at World Championships
 Carl Lewis
 Streak started 1983 Helsinki, Finland
 Streak ended 1993 Stuttgart, Germany
 Maurice Greene
 Streak started 1997 Athens, Greece
 Streak ended 2003 Saint-Denis, France

3 consecutive gold medals at World Championships
 United States
 Streak started 1983 Helsinki, Finland
 Streak ended 1993 Stuttgart, Germany
 United States
 Streak started 1997 Athens, Greece
 Streak ended 2003 Saint-Denis, France
 Jamaica
 Streak started 2009 Berlin, Germany

200m
3 consecutive gold medals at World Championships – Usain Bolt
 Streak started 2009 Berlin, Germany

3 consecutive gold medals at World Championships
 United States
 Streak started 1983 Helsinki, Finland
 Streak ended 1993 Stuttgart, Germany
 United States
 Streak started 2003 Saint-Denis, France
 Streak ended 2009 Berlin, Germany
 Jamaica
 Streak started 2009 Berlin, Germany

400m
4 consecutive gold medals at World Championships – Michael Johnson
 Streak started 1993 Stuttgart, Germany
 Streak ended 2001 Edmonton, Canada

5 consecutive gold medals at World Championships – United States
 Streak started 1991 Tokyo, Japan
 Streak ended 2001 Edmonton, Canada

800m
3 consecutive gold medals at World Championships – Wilson Kipketer
 Streak started 1995 Gothenburg, Sweden
 Streak ended 2001 Edmonton, Canada

3 consecutive gold medals at World Championships
 Kenya
 Streak started 1987 Rome, Italy
 Streak ended 1995 Gothenburg, Sweden
 Denmark
 Streak started 1995 Gothenburg, Sweden
 Streak ended 2001 Edmonton, Canada

1500m
4 consecutive gold medals at World Championships – Hicham El Guerrouj
 Streak started 1997 Athens, Greece
 Streak ended 2005 Helsinki, Finland

4 consecutive gold medals at World Championships – Morocco
 Streak started 1997 Athens, Greece
 Streak ended 2005 Helsinki, Finland

5000m
4 consecutive gold medals at World Championships – Kenya
 Streak started 1991 Tokyo, Japan
 Streak ended 1999 Seville, Spain

10000m
4 consecutive gold medals at World Championships
 Haile Gebrselassie
 Streak started 1993 Stuttgart, Germany
 Streak ended 2001 Edmonton, Canada
 Kenenisa Bekele
 Streak started 2003 Saint-Denis, France
 Streak ended 2011 Daegu, South Korea

5 consecutive gold medals at World Championships – Ethiopia
 Streak started 2003 Saint-Denis, France
 Streak ended 2013 Moscow, Russia

110m Hurdles
3 consecutive gold medals at World Championships – Greg Foster
 Streak started 1983 Helsinki, Finland
 Streak ended 1993 Stuttgart, Germany

3 consecutive gold medals at World Championships – United States
 Streak started 1983 Helsinki, Finland
 Streak ended 1993 Stuttgart, Germany

400m Hurdles
3 consecutive gold medals at World Championships – United States
 Streak started 2005 Helsinki, Finland
 Streak ended 2011 Daegu, South Korea

3000m Steeplechase
3 consecutive gold medals at World Championships
 Moses Kiptanui
 Streak started 1991 Tokyo, Japan
 Streak ended 1997 Athens, Greece
 Ezekiel Kemboi
 Streak started 2009 Berlin, Germany
 Streak ended 2017 London, United Kingdom

6 consecutive gold medals at World Championships – Kenya
 Streak started 1991 Tokyo, Japan
 Streak ended 2003 Saint-Denis, France

4 × 100 m Relay
4 consecutive gold medals at World Championships – United States
 Streak started 1983 Helsinki, Finland
 Streak ended 1995 Gothenburg, Sweden

4 × 400 m Relay
6 consecutive gold medals at World Championships – United States
 Streak started 2005 Helsinki, Finland
 Streak ended 2017 London, United Kingdom

Marathon
3 consecutive gold medals at World Championships
 Spain
 Streak started 1995 Gothenburg, Sweden
 Streak ended 2001 Edmonton, Canada
 Kenya
 Streak started 2007 Osaka, Japan
 Streak ended 2013 Moscow, Russia

20km Race Walk
3 consecutive gold medals at World Championships – Jefferson Pérez
 Streak started 2003 Saint-Denis, France
 Streak ended 2009 Berlin, Germany

3 consecutive gold medals at World Championships
 Ecuador
 Streak started 2003 Saint-Denis, France
 Streak ended 2009 Berlin, Germany
 Russia
 Streak started 2009 Berlin, Germany

Pole Vault
6 consecutive gold medals at World Championships – Sergey Bubka
 Streak started 1983 Helsinki, Finland
 Streak ended 1999 Seville, Spain

3 consecutive gold medals at World Championships
 Soviet Union
 Streak started 1983 Helsinki, Finland
 Streak ended 1993 Stuttgart, Germany
 Ukraine
 Streak started 1993 Stuttgart, Germany
 Streak ended 1999 Seville, Spain
Note: Ukraine gained independence from Soviet Union in 1991

Long Jump
4 consecutive gold medals at World Championships – Iván Pedroso
 Streak started 1995 Gothenburg, Sweden
 Streak ended 2003 Saint-Denis, France

4 consecutive gold medals at World Championships
 United States
 Streak started 1983 Helsinki, Finland
 Streak ended 1995 Gothenburg, Sweden
 Cuba
 Streak started 1995 Gothenburg, Sweden
 Streak ended 2003 Saint-Denis, France

Shot Put
3 consecutive gold medals at World Championships – Werner Günthör
 Streak started 1987 Rome, Italy
 Streak ended 1995 Gothenburg, Sweden

4 consecutive gold medals at World Championships – United States
 Streak started 1995 Gothenburg, Sweden
 Streak ended 2003 Saint-Denis, France

Discus Throw
4 consecutive gold medals at World Championships – Lars Riedel
 Streak started 1991 Tokyo, Japan
 Streak ended 1999 Seville, Spain

5 consecutive gold medals at World Championships – East Germany then Germany
 Streak started 1987 Rome, Italy
 Streak ended 1999 Seville, Spain

Hammer Throw
3 consecutive gold medals at World Championships
 Soviet Union
 Streak started 1983 Helsinki, Finland
 Streak ended 1993 Stuttgart, Germany
 Belarus
 Streak started 2003 Saint-Denis, France
 Streak ended 2009 Berlin, Germany

Decathlon
3 consecutive gold medals at World Championships
 Dan O'Brien
 Streak started 1991 Tokyo, Japan
 Streak ended 1997 Athens, Greece
 Tomáš Dvořák
 Streak started 1997 Athens, Greece
 Streak ended 2003 Saint-Denis, France

3 consecutive gold medals at World Championships
 United States
 Streak started 1991 Tokyo, Japan
 Streak ended 1997 Athens, Greece
 Czech Republic
 Streak started 1997 Athens, Greece
 Streak ended 2003 Saint-Denis, France
 United States
 Streak started 2009 Berlin, Germany

Women's

100m
4 consecutive gold medals at World Championships – United States
 Streak started 1993 Stuttgart, Germany
 Streak ended 2001 Edmonton, Canada

200m
3 consecutive gold medals at World Championships – Allyson Felix
 Streak started 2005 Helsinki, Finland
 Streak ended 2011 Daegu, South Korea

3 consecutive gold medals at World Championships
 East Germany then Germany
 Streak started 1983 Helsinki, Finland
 Streak ended 1993 Stuttgart, Germany
 United States
 Streak started 2005 Helsinki, Finland
 Streak ended 2011 Daegu, South Korea

5000m
3 consecutive gold medals at World Championships – Ethiopia
 Streak started 2003 Saint-Denis, France
 Streak ended 2009 Berlin, Germany

10000m
5 consecutive gold medals at World Championships – Ethiopia
 Streak started 1999 Seville, Spain
 Streak ended 2009 Berlin, Germany

4 × 400 m Relay
3 consecutive gold medals at World Championships – United States
 Streak started 2007 Osaka, Japan
 Streak ended 2013 Moscow, Russia

Race Walking
3 consecutive gold medals at World Championships – Olga Kaniskina
 Streak started 2007 Osaka, Japan
 Streak ended 2013 Moscow, Russia

7 consecutive gold medals at World Championships – Russia
 Streak started 2001 Edmonton, Canada
 Streak ended 2017 Beijing, China

Pole Vault
3 consecutive gold medals at World Championships – Russia
 Streak started 2003 Saint-Denis, France
 Streak ended 2009 Berlin, Germany

Long Jump
3 consecutive gold medals at World Championships – Brittney Reese
 Streak started 2009 Berlin, Germany
 Streak ended 2017 Doha, Qatar

3 consecutive gold medals at World Championships – United States
 Streak started 2009 Berlin, Germany
 Streak ended 2017 Doha, Qatar

Shot Put
4 consecutive gold medals at World Championships – Valerie (Vili) Adams
 Streak started 2007 Osaka, Japan

4 consecutive gold medals at World Championships – New Zealand
 Streak started 2007 Osaka, Japan

Heptathlon
3 consecutive gold medals at World Championships – Carolina Klüft
 Streak started 2003 Saint-Denis, France
 Streak ended 2009 Berlin, Germany

3 consecutive gold medals at World Championships – Sweden
 Streak started 2003 Saint-Denis, France
 Streak ended 2009 Berlin, Germany

Auto racing

Formula One

By driver

Michael Schumacher won 5 consecutive championships between 2000 and 2004.

Sebastian Vettel won 9 consecutive races in 2013.

By constructor

Mercedes-Benz has won 8 consecutive championships since 2014.

McLaren won 11 consecutive races in 1988.

Sports car racing

FIA GT1 World Championship
6 consecutive FIA GT Championship and (from 2010) FIA GT1 World Championship team titles
 Vitaphone Racing
 Streak started 2005
 Streak ended 2011
Note: All of the titles were achieved with the same car (Maserati MC12 GT1)

IMSA GTP
8 wins – Geoff Brabham and Nissan GTP ZX-Turbo chassis #8801 "Elvis"
 Streak started April 10, 1988
 Streak ended September 4, 1988

World Sportscar Championship
18 wins – Porsche 956
 Streak started October 3, 1982
 Streak ended on November 3, 1984

24 Hours of Le Mans

By driver

By constructor

By team
5 consecutive wins –
 Scuderia Ferrari
 Streak started 1960
 Streak ended 1965
 Joest Racing
 Streak started 2010
 Streak ended 2015

By car
4 consecutive wins
 Alfa Romeo 8C 2300
 Streak started 1931
 Streak ended 1935
 Ford GT40
 Streak started 1966
 Streak ended 1970
 Porsche 956
 Streak started 1982
 Streak ended 1986
 Audi R18
 Streak started 2011
 Streak ended 2015

By same car

IndyCar

Sébastien Bourdais won 4 consecutive Champ Car World Series titles between 2004 and 2007.

A. J. Foyt won 7 consecutive USAC Champ Car races in 1964, not counting the non-points Pikes Peak Hill Climb.

Five drivers won the Indianapolis 500 back-to-back: Wilbur Shaw, Mauri Rose, Bill Vukovich, Al Unser Sr. and Hélio Castroneves.

Two owners won the Indianapolis 500 on 3 consecutive years: Lou Moore from 1947 to 1949, and Roger Penske from 2001 to 2003.

World Rally Championship
Sébastien Loeb won 9 consecutive drivers championships between 2004 and 2012. Loeb choose to not enter most events in 2013.

The Frenchman also won 6 consecutive WRC events twice in 2005 and 2008-2009.

Lancia won 6 consecutive constructors championships between 1987 and 1992.

NASCAR Cup Series
Jimmie Johnson won 5 consecutive drivers championships between 2006 and 2010.

Chevrolet won 13 manufacturers championships between 2003 and 2015.

Richard Petty won 10 consecutive races in 1967.

Note:  Because of the post-1972 schedule overhaul, NASCAR will differentiate records from pre-1972 and post-1972.  The primary schedule overhaul eliminated midweek races, thus cutting the schedule from 48 to around 30 races (36 currently), and a minimum race distance (first , later shortened to ).  Since many pre-1972 races were under 100 miles (such as 62.5 mile races held in Islip, New York, and the current non-championship Budweiser Duel then being a championship race at 100 miles until 1967), some NASCAR records are differentiated that way, similar to the NBA differentiating "fewest points" records with pre and post-1954 records, when the 24-second shot clock was introduced.

Post–1972, multiple drivers have won 4 consecutive races:
 1976 Cale Yarborough
 1981 Darrell Waltrip
 1987 Dale Earnhardt
 1991 Harry Gant
 1992 Bill Elliott
 1993 Mark Martin
 1998 Jeff Gordon
 2007 Jimmie Johnson

Note:  In seven of the eight instances, at least one of the wins was in a 500-mile race.  Mark Martin's 1993 streak ended at Darlington, where the Mountain Dew Southern 500 was stopped 16 laps early because of darkness.

Baseball
See #Bat-and-ball games

Basketball

FIBA
 United States men's national basketball team: 58 games from the 1992 Olympic Games to the 2002 FIBA World Championship.

Olympics

NBA

33 games – 1971–72 Los Angeles Lakers
 Streak started November 5, 1971 (defeated Baltimore Bullets, 110–106)
 Streak ended January 9, 1972 (defeated by Milwaukee Bucks, 104–120)

College (United States)

NCAA Women's Division I

All games 
111 games – UConn
 Started November 23, 2014 (defeated Creighton 96–60)
 Ended March 31, 2017 (defeated by Mississippi State 66–64)

Note: The Wayland Baptist College women's basketball team achieved a winning streak of 131 games which started November 7, 1953, and ended March 20, 1958 (defeated 46–42 by Nashville Business School).  However, a national organizing structure for women's intercollegiate basketball did not exist until the AIAW was established in 1971; the NCAA did not begin organizing women's sports until 1981. Wayland Baptist instead played in competitions sponsored by the Amateur Athletic Union.

Regular-season games only 
By NCAA convention, the "regular season" does not include games in conference tournaments or in any national postseason tournament.

126 games – UConn
 Started November 23, 2014 (defeated Creighton 96–60)
 Ended January 3, 2019 (defeated by Baylor 68–57)

NCAA Women's Division II 
73 games – Ashland University
 Started November 11, 2016
 Ended March 23, 2018 (defeated by Central Missouri 66-52)

NCAA Women's Division III 
88 games – Washington (MO)
 Started February 20, 1998
 Ended January 16, 2001 (defeated by Fontbonne College 79-68)

U Sports Women's Basketball (Canadian universities) 
88 games – Winnipeg (MB)
 Started October 24, 1992 (defeated the University of Alberta Golden Bears 75-53).
 Ended December 2, 1994 (defeated by the University of Manitoba Bisons 62-64).
The Lady Wesmen would go on to a record 118–1 in the span from 1992–1995, including 3 CIS (now U Sports) national basketball championships and beating several NCAA Women's Division I programs in North American tournaments.

NCAA Men's Division I

All games 
88 games – UCLA
 Started January 30, 1971 (defeated UC Santa Barbara 74–61)
 Ended January 19, 1974 (defeated by Notre Dame 70-71)

Regular-season games only 
By NCAA convention, the "regular season" does not include games in conference tournaments or in any national postseason tournament.

74 games – UCLA
 This streak was a subset of UCLA's overall winning streak of 88 games, with the same starting and ending dates.

Home games 
129 games – Kentucky
 Started January 4, 1943 (defeated Fort Knox 64-30)
 Ended January 8, 1955 (defeated by Georgia Tech 59–58)

NCAA Men's Division II 
57 games – Winona State University
 Started January 13, 2006
 Ended March 24, 2007 (defeated by Barton College 77-75)

NCAA Men's Division III 
60 games – SUNY Potsdam
 Started first game of 1985 season
 Streak last win March 14, 1987

Greek League

Greek Women's Basketball League
137 games winning streak – Olympiacos Peiraeus
 Streak started 2015
 Streak continues till today

Greek Basket League
80 games – Aris Thessaloniki
 Streak started 1986
 Streak ended 1988

Bat-and-ball games

Baseball

World Championships

World Baseball Classic
2 consecutive titles – Japan (2006 and 2009)

World Cup
9 consecutive titles – Cuba
 Streak started 1984 Havana, Cuba
 Streak ended 2007 Taipei, Taiwan

Major League Baseball

By a team
26 games – New York Giants (1916)
 Streak started September 7, 1916 (defeated Brooklyn Dodgers, 4–1)
 Streak ended September 30, 1916 (defeated by Boston Braves, 3–8)

Note: during the above streak, the Giants tied the Pittsburgh Pirates in the second game of a doubleheader, 1–1, on September 18, 1916. Major League Baseball (MLB) excludes all games that end in ties from a team's statistics. The longest winning streak in MLB that does not include a tie is 22 games, achieved by the Cleveland Indians in 2017, which is also the longest winning streak in the American League. The National League record for consecutive wins without a tie is 21 games, by the Chicago Cubs in 1935.

By a pitcher
24 consecutive winning decisions – Carl Hubbell, New York Giants
 Streak started July 17, 1936 (defeated Pittsburgh Pirates, 6–0)
 Streak ended May 30, 1937 (ended by Brooklyn Dodgers, 3–10)

Note: Hubbell's streak was achieved in 27 games as it also included three no decisions. In baseball, only losing decisions can end winning streaks by pitchers.

Minor League Baseball
29 games – Salt Lake City Trappers of the Pioneer League
 Streak started June 25, 1987 (defeated Pocatello Giants, 12–6)
 Streak ended July 27, 1987 (lost to Billings Mustangs, 5–7)

The Toronto Blue Jays' affiliate in the rookie-level Dominican Summer League, the DSL Blue Jays, claim a 37-game winning streak to begin the 1992 season. The team went on to compile a regular season record of 68–2, then were eliminated in the first round of the postseason.

College (United States)

NCAA Division I
34 consecutive games
 Texas
 Streak started February 18, 1977 (defeated Texas Wesleyan 3–1)
 Streak ended March 26, 1977 (defeated by Rice 3–4)
 Florida Atlantic
 Streak started February 19, 1999 (defeated Clemson 3–0)
 Streak ended March 17, 1999 (defeated by Florida 9–4)
22 consecutive post season games – South Carolina
 Streak started June 22, 2010 (defeated Arizona State 11–4)
 Streak ended June 19, 2012 (Defeated by Arkansas 2-1 – 2nd-round game in 2012 CWS)
12 consecutive College World Series games – South Carolina
 Streak started June 22, 2010 (defeated Arizona State 11–4)
 Streak ended June 19, 2012 (Defeated by Arkansas 2-1 – 2nd-round game in 2012 CWS)

NCAA Division II
46 games – 2000 Savannah State

NCAA Division III
44 games – 2008 Trinity College (Connecticut)

NAIA
41 games – 1990 Point Park College (Pittsburgh, PA)

Softball
7 consecutive World Championships – United States
 Streak started 1986 Auckland, New Zealand
 Streak ended 2012 Whitehorse, Yukon Territory, Canada

College athletics in the United States

NJCAA

88 straight games – Butler Community College
 Streak started on March 3, 2016(defeated Barton Community College 9-1)
 Streak ended on May 6, 2017 (defeated by Seward County Community College 6-5)

Cricket

Men's Test

16 matches – Australia
 Streak started October 17, 1999 (defeated Zimbabwe by 10 wickets at Harare) (scorecard)
 Streak ended March 15, 2001 (lost to India by 171 runs at Calcutta) (scorecard)

Note: Australia equalled this record with another 16 wins in a row from December 2005 until January 2008.

Men's ODI

21 matches – Australia
 Streak started January 11, 2003 (defeated England by 7 runs at Hobart) (scorecard)
 Streak ended May 25, 2003 (lost to West Indies by 31 runs at Port of Spain) (scorecard)

Men's World Cup

26 matches – Australia
 Streak started June 20, 1999 (defeated Pakistan by 8 wickets at Lord's) (scorecard)
 Streak ended March 19, 2011 (lost to Pakistan by 4 wickets at Colombo) (scorecard)

Men's T20I

12 matches – Afghanistan
 Streak started on February 5, 2018 (defeated Zimbabwe)
 Streak ended September 20, 2019 (lost to Zimbabwe)

Men's International Cricket (All Forms)

20 matches (17 ODIs and 3 tests) – Australia
 Streak started January 11, 2003 (defeated England by 7 runs in an ODI at Hobart) (scorecard)
 Streak ended May 13, 2003 (lost to West Indies by 3 wickets in a test match at St John's) (scorecard)

Women's Test

3 matches – Australia (1985-1987, 1991-1992, 2001–2003) and India (2006–present)

Women's ODI

22 matches – Australia
 Streak started March 12, 2018 (defeated India)
 Streak is current and ongoing as of April 4, 2021.

Women's T20I

17 matches – Thailand
 Streak started on July 12, 2018 (defeated UAE)
 Streak ended August 12, 2019 (lost to Scotland)

Domestic or Club Twenty20

25 matches – Sialkot Stallions (Pakistan)
 Streak started February 24, 2006 (defeated Lahore Eagles by 8 wickets at Karachi) (scorecard)
 Streak ended October 14, 2010 (lost to Rawalpindi Rams by 13 runs at Lahore) (scorecard)

Boating

Canoeing

Men's

C-1
3 consecutive gold medals at ICF Canoe Slalom World Championships – Jon Lugbill
 Streak started 1979 Jonquière, Quebec, Canada
 Streak ended 1985 Augsburg, West Germany

6 consecutive gold medals at ICF Canoe Slalom World Championships – United States
 Streak started 1979 Jonquière, Quebec, Canada
 Streak ended 1991 Tacen, Yugoslavia

C-1 Team
7 consecutive gold medals at ICF Canoe Slalom World Championships – United States
 Streak started 1979 Jonquière, Quebec, Canada
 Streak ended 1993 Mezzana, Italy

C-2
5 consecutive gold medals at ICF Canoe Slalom World Championships – East Germany
 Streak started 1957 Augsburg, West Germany
 Streak ended 1967 Lipno, Czechoslovakia

C-2 Team
3 consecutive gold medals at ICF Canoe Slalom World Championships
 France
 Streak started 1987 Bourg St.-Maurice, France
 Streak ended 1993 Mezzana, Italy
 East Germany
 Streak started 1959 Geneva, Switzerland
 Streak ended 1965 Spittal an der Drau, Austria
 France
 Streak started 1949 Geneva, Switzerland
 Streak ended 1955 Tacen, Yugoslavia

Kayaking

Men's

K-1
3 consecutive gold medals at ICF Canoe Slalom World Championships – Richard Fox
 Streak started 1981 Bala, Wales, United Kingdom
 Streak ended 1987 Bourg St.-Maurice, France

3 consecutive gold medals at ICF Canoe Slalom World Championships
 Great Britain
 Streak started 1989 Savage River, Maryland, United States
 Streak ended 1995 Nottingham, England
 Great Britain
 Streak started 1981 Bala, Wales, United Kingdom
 Streak ended 1987 Bourg St.-Maurice, France
 West Germany
 Streak started 1953 Merano, Italy
 Streak ended 1959 Geneva, Switzerland

K-1 Team
4 consecutive gold medals at ICF Canoe Slalom World Championships – East Germany
 Streak started 1957 Augsburg, West Germany
 Streak ended 1965 Spittal an der Drau, Austria

Women's

K-1
3 consecutive gold medals at ICF Canoe Slalom World Championships – Austria
 Streak started 1949 Geneva, Switzerland
 Streak ended 1955 Tacen, Yugoslavia

K-1 Team
6 consecutive gold medals at ICF Canoe Slalom World Championships – East Germany
 Streak started 1955 Tacen, Yugoslavia
 Streak ended 1969 Bourg St.-Maurice, France

Rowing

Men's Coxless Pair
15 consecutive major titles (World Cups and World Championships)  – Eric Murray, Hamish Bond
 Streak started 2009 Munich, Germany

Women's Eights
9 consecutive world titles (Olympic Games and World Championships) - United States
 Streak started 2006 Eton, England

Sailing

America's Cup
25 Cups – United States
 Streak started 1851 (inaugural race), beating England
 Streak ended 1983 (beaten by Australia II from Australia).

Note: With 132 years, this is the longest winning streak by years in sports history.

Olympics

4 consecutive Olympic titles – Ben Ainslie
 Streak started 2000 Sydney, Australia

4 consecutive Olympic titles – Paul Elvstrøm
 Streak started 1948 London, Britain
 Streak ended 1964 Tokyo, Japan

Bowling
3 consecutive titles at PBA World Championship
 Earl Anthony
 Streak started 1981
 Streak ended 1984
 Earl Anthony
 Streak started 1973
 Streak ended 1976

Combat sports

Boxing

Professional
87 – Julio César Chávez (light welterweight)
 Streak started February 5, 1980 (defeated Andres Felix) (Chávez's first professional bout)
 Streak ended September 10, 1993 (draw with Pernell Whitaker)
Note 1: Included is the controversial win against Meldrick Taylor in March 1990, which could have ended the streak at 68 wins
Note 2: After two more wins Chávez lost to Frankie Randall on January 29, 1994, to end an unbeaten streak of 90 matches.

Longest unbeaten streaks:

103 – Jimmy Wilde (flyweight)
 Streak started December 26, 1910 (defeated Les Williams) (Wilde's first professional bout)
 Streak ended January 25, 1915 (defeated by Tancy Lee)

93 – Pedro Carrasco  (lightweight)
 Streak started April 22, 1964 (defeated Giuliano Scatolini)
 Streak ended February 18, 1972 (defeated by Mando Ramos)

91 – Sugar Ray Robinson (middleweight)
 Streak started February 19, 1943 (defeated Jackie Wilson)
 Streak ended July 10, 1951 (defeated by Randy Turpin)

Amateur
Longest unbeaten streaks:
200+ – Vasyl Lomachenko
 Streak started November 2007 (first and subsequently last loss as an amateur)
 Streak ended October 2013 (turned professional)

Olympics

World Championship
6 consecutive heavyweight World Championships – Félix Savón
 Streak started 1986 Reno, Nevada, United States
 Streak ended 1999 Houston, Texas, United States

Note: winner of 3 consecutive Olympic gold medals (1992–2000)

Judo
6 consecutive titles at World Championships – Ryoko Tani
 Streak started 1993 Hamilton, Canada
 Streak ended 2005 Cairo, Egypt

Mixed martial arts

Men's
40 fights
 Travis Fulton
 Streak started April 23, 2005
 Streak ended May 19, 2007

31 fights
 Renan Barão
 Streak started May 13, 2005
 Streak ended May 24, 2014, UFC 173
 Luis Rafael Laurentino
 Streak started June 17, 2012
 Streak ended February 20, 2016

29 fights
 Khabib Nurmagamedov
 Streak started September 13, 2008
 Retired from MMA on October 24, 2020

Women's
22 fights – Megumi Fujii
 Streak started August 9, 2004
 Streak ended October 28, 2010, at Bellator 34

Professional wrestling
Since matches have predetermined outcomes, winning streaks in professional wrestling are orchestrated by the wrestling organizations.

World Championship Wrestling

Singles Matches

"173 consecutive matches" – Bill Goldberg
 Streak started 1997 Dalton, Georgia
 Streak ended 1998 Washington, D.C.

Note: While the tally of 173 matches was listed by World Championship Wrestling as the legitimate total, it is fictitious number. WCW inflated the win count to make Goldberg look more dominant.

World Wrestling Entertainment

Singles Matches
"914 days unbeaten" – Asuka

249+ matches
 Streak started October 7, 2015 NXT TakeOver: Respect (Beat Dana Brooke)
 Streak ended April 8, 2018 Wrestlemania 34 (Beaten by Charlotte Flair)

Singles Matches at WrestleMania
21 consecutive matches – The Undertaker, (known as The Streak)
 Streak started 1991 Los Angeles, California against Jimmy Snuka
 Streak ended 2014 New Orleans, Louisiana against Brock Lesnar
Note: Included 1 win via disqualification (1993).

Wrestling

Olympics

World Championships

Men's Freestyle
6 consecutive titles at World Championships – Sergey Beloglazov
 Streak started 1981 Skopje, Yugoslavia
 Streak ended 1989 Martigny, Switzerland

19 consecutive team titles at World Championships – USSR
 Streak started 1967 New Delhi, India
 Streak ended 1993 Toronto, Canada

Men's Greco-Roman
9 consecutive titles at World Championships – Alexander Karelin
 Streak started 1989 Martigny, Switzerland
 Streak ended 2000 Retired after Sydney Olympics

Note: winner of 3 consecutive Olympic gold medals (1988–1996)

21 consecutive team titles at World Championships – USSR and Russia
 Streak started 1973 Tehran, Iran
 Streak ended 2001 Patras, Greece

Women's Freestyle
6 consecutive team titles at World Championships – Japan
 Streak started 2002 Chalcis, Greece
 Streak ended 2009 Herning, Denmark

College (USA)
159 matches – Cael Sanderson, Iowa State

Note: never lost a single NCAA match in entire collegiate career (1998–2002)

High school (USA)
459 consecutive matches – Brandon High School, Brandon, Florida
 Streak started January 28, 1974
 Streak ended January 5, 2008

Sumo
69 matches – Futabayama Sadaji
 Streak started January 7, 1936
 Streak ended January 3, 1939 (ended by Akinoumi Setsuo)

Cue sports

English billiards

IBSF World Billiards Championship

Timed
3 consecutive titles – Pankaj Advani
 Streak started 2005 Malta
 Streak ended 2010 Maharashtra, India

3 consecutive titles – India
 Streak started 2005 Malta
 Streak ended 2010 Maharashtra, India

Points
3 consecutive titles – Bob Marshall
 Streak started 1936 Johannesburg, South Africa
 Streak ended 1952 Calcutta, India

5 consecutive titles – India
 Streak started 1981 Delhi, India
 Streak ended 1996 India

World Billiards Championship
4 consecutive titles
 Joe Davis
 Streak started 1928
 Streak ended 1933
 Tom Newman
 Streak started 1924
 Streak ended 1928
 Melbourne Inman
 Streak started 1912
 Streak ended 1920

31 consecutive titles – England
 Streak started April 1892
 Streak ended 1933

Pool

WEPF Eight-ball Pool World Championship
13 consecutive titles – England
 Streak started 2000 Blackpool, United Kingdom
 Streak ended 2013 Blackpool, United Kingdom

VIPA League
9 Consecutive wins - Liam Gallagher (also ended the streak of 12 by Andrew Akesson)
But Andrew accumulated 34 seven balls during this momentous feat. Along with winning an incredible £180 in purse winnings for his destruction of Liam Gallagher.

WPA World Nine-ball Championship

Men's
3 consecutive titles – United States
 Streak started 1990 Bergheim, Germany
 Streak ended 1993 Königswinter, Germany

Women's
3 consecutive titles – Allison Fisher
 Streak started 1996 Borlänge, Sweden
 Streak ended 1999 Alicante, Spain

3 consecutive titles
 China
 Streak started 2009 Shenyang, China
 Streak ended 2012 Shenyang, China
 United Kingdom
 Streak started 1996 Borlänge, Sweden
 Streak ended 1999 Alicante, Spain

Snooker
15 consecutive titles at World Snooker Championship – Joe Davis
 Streak started 1927 Birmingham, England
 Streak ended 1947 London, England

15 consecutive titles at World Snooker Championship – England
 Streak started 1927 Birmingham, England
 Streak ended 1947 London, England

29 Consecutive match wins at World Championship - Stephen Hendry
 Streak started 1992 Sheffield, England
 Streak ended 1997 Sheffield, England

Three-cushion billiards

UMB World Three-cushion Championship
11 consecutive titles – Raymond Ceulemans
 Streak started 1963 Neuss/Düsseldorf, Germany
 Streak ended 1974 Antwerpen, Belgium

11 consecutive titles at – Belgium
 Streak started 1963 Neuss/Düsseldorf, Germany
 Streak ended 1974 Antwerpen, Belgium

CEB European Three-cushion Championship
11 consecutive titles – Raymond Ceulemans
 Streak started 1962
 Streak ended 1973

22 consecutive titles at – Belgium
 Streak started 1962
 Streak ended 1984

Cycling

Men's

Road
5 consecutive Tour de France – Miguel Indurain
 Streak started 1991
 Streak ended 1995

(Note: The 7 consecutive Tour de France titles won by Lance Armstrong were stripped in 2012 following an investigation by the United States Anti-Doping Agency that found he had used and trafficked performance-enhancing drugs. The respective titles remain vacant to date.)

Track
10 consecutive  men's sprint world championships – Kōichi Nakano
 Streak started 1977 San Cristóbal, Venezuela
 Streak ended 1987 Vienna, Austria (did not compete)

Women's

Track
5 consecutive Women's sprint world championships – Félicia Ballanger
 Streak started 1995 Bogotá, Colombia
 Streak ended 2000 Manchester, United Kingdom
Note: winner of 3 Olympic gold medals in cycling

15 consecutive Women's sprint world championships – Soviet Union
 Streak started 1958 Paris, France
 Streak ended 1973 San Sebastian, Spain

3 consecutive  – 
 Streak started 2018 , Japan
 Streak ended 2021 Shizuoka

34 consecutive  victories (including heats) – 
 Streak started July 29, 2021
 Streak ended December 29 (at above tournament)
12 consecutive Girls Keirin tournament victories
 Yuka Kobayashi
 Streak started January 12, 2015
 Streak ended July 1
 
 Streak started July 29, 2021
 Streak ended December 29

Downhill
14 consecutive rounds of the UCI Mountain Bike World Cup in women's downhill – Rachel Atherton
 Streak started 2015 Round 2 Fort William, Scotland
 Streak ended 2017 Round 2 Fort William, Scotland

8 consecutive UCI Mountain Bike World Championships in women's downhill – Anne-Caroline Chausson
 Streak started 1996 Cairns, Australia
 Streak ended 2004 Les Gets, France

Darts

Men's

8 consecutive titles at PDC World Darts Championship – Phil Taylor
 Streak started 1995 Purfleet, England
 Streak ended 2003 Purfleet, England

9 consecutive titles at PDC World Darts Championship – England
 Streak started 1994 Purfleet, England
 Streak ended 2003 Purfleet, England

3 consecutive titles at BDO World Darts Championship – Eric Bristow
 Streak started 1984 Stoke-on-Trent, England
 Streak ended 1987 Surrey, England

6 consecutive titles at BDO World Darts Championship – England
 Streak started 1983 Stoke-on-Trent, England
 Streak ended 1989 Surrey, England

Women's

7 consecutive titles at BDO World Darts Championship – Trina Gulliver
 Streak started 2001 Surrey, England
 Streak ended 2008 Surrey, England

7 consecutive titles at BDO World Darts Championship – England
 Streak started 2001 Surrey, England
 Streak ended 2008 Surrey, England

Equine sports

Dressage
7 consecutive Olympic Team titles – Germany
 Streak started 1984 Los Angeles, USA
 Streak ended 2012 London, United Kingdom

9 consecutive World Championships – Germany
 Streak started 1974 Copenhagen, Denmark
 Streak ended 2010 Lexington, Kentucky

Horse racing

By a racehorse
56 races – Camarero
 Streak started April 19, 1953
 Streak ended August 1, 1955
 5 Connective horse of the year titles- Kelso

Harness Racing 
56 Races – Trebol
 Streak started September 30, 2017
 Streak ended October 13, 2019
 Consecutive american harness horse of the year titles - Bret Hanover, Nevele Pride

By a jockey
12 races – Gordon Richards
 Streak started October 3, 1933
 Streak ended October 5, 1933

Show jumping

Individual
3 consecutive titles at Show Jumping World Championships – West Germany - But by whom?
 Streak started 1974 Hickstead, West Sussex, England
 Streak ended 1986 Aachen, Germany

Esports

Counter-Strike: Global Offensive

87 Games – Ninjas in Pyjamas
 Streak started September 14, 2012 (defeated PRiME, 16–3)
 Streak ended April 7, 2013 (defeated by Virtus.Pro, 19–15)

3 Major Tournaments – Astralis
 Streak started September 24, 2018 (defeated Natus Vincere, 2–0)
 Streak ended November 1, 2021 (defeated by Team Vitality, 1–2)

18 Major playoff games – Astralis
 Streak started September 22, 2018 (defeated FaZe, 2–0)
 Streak ended November 1, 2021 (defeated by Team Vitality, 1–2)
 Note: Streak ended due to Astralis failing to make the playoffs at PGL Major Stockholm 2021.

League of Legends

LEC
24 Games – G2 Esports
 Streak started April 2, 2022 (defeated Team Vitality 3–0)
 Streak ended May 22, 2022 (defeated by PSG Talon 0–1)

LCS
17 Games – Team SoloMid
 Streak started June 26, 2016 (defeated Echo Fox 2–1)
 Streak ended July 24, 2016 (defeated by Phoenix1 1–2)

LCK
19 Games – SK Telecom T1
 Streak started August 12, 2015 (defeated NaJin e-mFire 2–1)
 Streak ended October 31, 2015 (defeated by ROX Tigers 3–1)

LPL

22 Games – Invictus Gaming
 Streak started February 7, 2018 (defeated FunPlus Phoenix 2–1)
 Streak ended April 3, 2018 (defeated by Suning Gaming 2–1)

Overwatch

Overwatch League
20 Regular Season Matches – San Francisco Shock
 Streak started August 2, 2021 (defeated Boston Uprising 3–1)
 Streak ended September 3, 2022 (defeated by Dallas Fuel 1–3)

28 Games – San Francisco Shock
 Streak started April 6, 2019 (defeated Los Angeles Valiant 4–0)
 Streak ended May 10, 2019 (defeated Shanghai Dragons 3−1)

Overwatch Contenders
38 Matches – British Hurricane
 Streak started January 18, 2020 (defeated Angry Titans 3−0)
 Streak ended November 23, 2020 (defeated by Obey Alliance 0−3)

Valorant 
54 Matches – Vision Strikers
 Streak started July 16, 2020 (defeated TYLOO 2−0)
 Streak ended February 18, 2021 (drew with ZFGaming 1−1)

Dota 2

29 Games − Newbee
 Streak started January 29, 2016 (defeated Invictus Gaming 2−1)
 Streak ended May 12, 2016 (defeated by OG 1−2)

Fencing

Women's Foil
3 consecutive Olympic titles – Valentina Vezzali
 Streak started 2000 Sydney, Australia
 Streak ended 2012 London, United Kingdom

Men's Saber
3 consecutive Olympic titles – Áron Szilágyi
 Streak started 2012 London, United Kingdom

Football

Association football

International
22 FIFA World Cup appearances – Brazil
 Streak started 1930, Uruguay (Inaugural World Cup)

Note: Brazil is the only national football team to have played in every World Cup.

16 consecutive FIFA World Cup second round qualifications – Germany
 Streak started 1954, Switzerland
 Streak ended 2018, Russia

15 competitive games (i.e. excluding friendlies) – Germany
 Streak started July 10, 2010 (defeated Uruguay, 3–2)
 Streak ended June 28, 2012 (defeated by Italy, 1–2)

15 games – Spain
 Streak started June 26, 2008 (defeated Russia, 3–0)
 Streak ended June 24, 2009 (defeated by United States, 0–2)

Italy holds the current unbeaten record of 37 matches, followed by Argentina with 36, and then Spain, Brazil and Algeria with 35 games each. Brazil's loss at the 1996 CONCACAF Gold Cup was by the under-23 (Olympic) team, but is officially counted as a loss of the national team. Otherwise the Brazil national team wouldn't lose until May 30, 1997 (2–4 vs Norway), thus extending the streak to 42 games. Brazil lost the 27th match of their streak on penalties in the 1995 Copa América Final on July 22, 1995, but this is considered a draw in regular play.

19 games (women's) – United States
 Streak started July 25, 1990 (defeated Norway 4–0)
 Streak ended May 28, 1991 (defeated by Netherlands 3–4)

51 games undefeated (women's) – United States
 Streak started December 8, 2004 (defeated Mexico 5–0)
 Streak ended September 22, 2007 (defeated by Brazil 0–4)

National leagues winning streaks
 Note that teams may have drawn or even lost matches outside the indicated leagues during the streak periods.

Czechoslovak First League precursor
51 games – 1920–1923 Sparta Prague

Jordan League
32 games – 2001–2003 Al-Faisaly

Primeira Liga
29 games – 1971–1973 Benfica

Argentine Primera División
28 games – 1918–19 Racing Club

Croatian League
28 games – Dinamo Zagreb
 Streak started November 8, 2006 (defeated NK Pula 1856 5–1)
 Streak ended September 23, 2007 (defeated by Varteks 3–4)

Scottish Premier League
25 games – Celtic
 Streak started August 16, 2003 (defeated Dundee United 5–0)
 Streak ended March 14, 2004 (drew Motherwell 1–1)

Ukrainian Premier League
24 games – Shakhtar Donetsk
 Streak started March 10, 2012 (defeated Illichivets Mariupol 2–1)
 Streak ended November 17, 2012 (defeated by Arsenal Kiev 0–2)

Swedish League (Allsvenskan)
23 games – 1949–1950 Malmö FF (part of 49 games unbeaten streak)

Eredivisie
22 games – 1987–1988 PSV Eindhoven

USL Championship
20 games – Phoenix Rising FC
 Streak started on May 10, 2019 (defeated Rio Grande Valley FC Toros 3–1)
 Streak ended on September 21, 2019 (defeated by Fresno FC 1–2)

Bundesliga
19 games – Bayern Munich
 Streak started October 19, 2013 (defeated Mainz 05 4–1)
 Streak ended March 29, 2014 (drew 1899 Hoffenheim 3–3)

Note: Part of 53 games unbeaten streak with 46 wins and 7 draws, matchday 10 in 2012–13 to matchday 28 in 2013–14)

Premier League
18 games (tie)

– Manchester City
 Streak started: August 26, 2017 (defeated Bournemouth 2–1)
 Streak ended: December 31, 2017 (drew Crystal Palace 0–0)

– Liverpool
 Streak started October 27, 2019 (defeated Tottenham Hotspur, 2–1)
 Streak ended February 29, 2020 (defeated by Watford, 0–3)

Serie A
17 games – Inter Milan
 Streak started October 25, 2006 (defeated Livorno 4–1)
 Streak ended February 28, 2007 (drew Udinese 1–1)

Ligue 1
16 games – Monaco
 Streak started February 25, 2017 (defeated Guingamp 2–1)
 Streak ended September 9, 2017 (defeated by Nice 0–4)

La Liga
16 games (tie)

– Barcelona
 Streak started October 16, 2010 (defeated Valencia 2–1)
 Streak ended February 12, 2011 (drew Sporting Gijón 1–1)
Note: The November 2015 to April 2016 39-match streak was an unbeaten streak, not a winning streak, and included 6 draws

– Real Madrid
 Streak started March 2, 2016 (defeated Levante 3–1)
 Streak ended September 18, 2016 (drew Villarreal 1–1)
Note: last 12 games in 2015–16 season and first 4 games in 2016–17 season; Real Madrid holds the longest unbeaten streak record with 40 games

Chilean Primera División
16 games – 1963–1964 Club Universidad de Chile

Major League Soccer
15 games – Los Angeles Galaxy
 Streak started September 7, 1997 (defeated Tampa Bay Mutiny 6–1)
 Streak ended May 20, 1998 (defeated by Chicago Fire 1–3)

Note: Between 1996–1999, games tied at the end of regulation time were decided by shoot-outs. Only one of those wins was achieved through a shoot-out. Since then, MLS abolished the shoot-out in favor of the international model of letting regular season draws stand.

Campeonato Brasileiro Série A
12 games – 1978–1978 Guarani

A-League
10 games – Western Sydney Wanderers
 Streak started January 13, 2013 (defeated Wellington Phoenix 2–0)
 Streak ended March 23, 2013 (drew Sydney FC 1–1)

I-League
9 games – Mohun Bagan
 Streak started October 31, 2008 (defeated Dempo SC 1–0)
 Streak ended February 22, 2009 (defeated by East Bengal F.C. 0–3)

Note: Mohun Bagan A.C. are currently in the midst of the longest unbeaten streak in I-League history at 14 games, started on December 11, 2019 – present

Unbeaten streaks
The three longest undefeated streaks in domestic top level leagues are:
 108 games – ASEC Mimosas, Ivory Coast, 1989 – June 19, 1994
 106 games – Steaua București, Romania,  June 17, 1986 – September 9, 1989
 85 games – Espérance de Tunis, Tunisia, October 19, 1997 – April 4, 2001

Note: Steaua București played 16 domestic cup games during the streak, of which only the first was lost. Overall, after a cup loss to Dinamo Bucuresti on June 25, 1986, to their league loss on September 9, 1989, to Dinamo, Steaua was undefeated in 119 consecutive domestic games.

College soccer (Women's)
101 games – 1990–1994 North Carolina
 Streak started September 23, 1990
 Streak ended October 20, 1994

College soccer (Men's)
65 games – Penn State
 Streak started: November 5, 1932 (vs. Army)
 Streak ended: November 15, 1941 (vs. Army)

Australian rules football

VFA/VFL
49 wins – 1914–1919 North Melbourne

WAFL
35 wins – 1945–47 East Fremantle

SANFL
30 wins – 1913–15 Port Adelaide

VFL/AFL
23 wins – 1952–53 Geelong

Gridiron football

American football

National Football League

Consecutive games won (regular season and playoffs)

21 games – New England Patriots
 Streak started October 5, 2003 (defeated Tennessee Titans, 38–30)
 Streak ended October 31, 2004 (defeated by Pittsburgh Steelers, 20–34)

Consecutive regular season games won

23 games – Indianapolis Colts
 Streak started November 2, 2008 (defeated New England Patriots, 18–15)
 Streak ended December 27, 2009 (defeated by New York Jets, 15–29)

Consecutive home games won (regular season and playoffs)

29 games – Green Bay Packers
 Streak started September 17, 1995 (defeated New York Giants, 14-6)
 Streak ended October 5, 1998 (defeated by Minnesota Vikings, 24-37)

Consecutive regular season home games won

25 games – Green Bay Packers
 Streak started September 17, 1995 (defeated New York Giants, 14-6)
 Streak ended October 5, 1998 (defeated by Minnesota Vikings, 24-37)

Consecutive non-home games won (regular season, playoffs, and Super Bowls)
21 games – San Francisco 49ers
 Streak started November 27, 1988 (defeated San Diego Chargers, 48-10)
 Streak ended September 2, 1991 (defeated by New York Giants, 14-16)

Consecutive road games won (regular season and playoffs)
19 games – San Francisco 49ers
 Streak started November 27, 1988 (defeated San Diego Chargers, 48-10)
 Streak ended September 2, 1991 (defeated by New York Giants, 14-16)

Consecutive regular season road games won
18 games – San Francisco 49ers
 Streak started November 27, 1988 (defeated San Diego Chargers, 48-10)
 Streak ended September 2, 1991 (defeated by New York Giants, 14-16)

College football
Pre-NCAA
37 games – Yale Bulldogs
 Streak started November 27, 1890 (defeated Princeton, 32-0)
 Streak ended November 30, 1893 (defeated by Princeton, 0–6)

Note: Prior to the formation of the NCAA collegiate teams played against a variety of amateur teams including local athletic clubs, YMCAs, and Indian schools as well as other colleges. Those victories are included in the win tally.

NCAA Division I

47 games – Oklahoma Sooners
 Streak started October 10, 1953 (defeated Texas, 19–14)
 Streak ended November 16, 1957 (defeated by Notre Dame, 0–7)

Longest unbeaten streak

64 games (60–0–4) – Washington Huskies
 Streak started November 28, 1907 (tied Idaho, 0–0)
 Streak ended November 3, 1917 (defeated by California, 0–27)

NCAA Division II

40 games – Grand Valley State Lakers
 Streak started August 27, 2005 (defeated Ferris State 30–10)
 Streak ended December 8, 2007 (defeated by Northwest Missouri State, 16–34)

Note: This streak includes playoff games.

NCAA Division III

55 games – Mount Union Purple Raiders
 Streak started September 2, 2000 (defeated Allegheny, 48–21)
 Streak ended December 20, 2003 (defeated by St. John's (MN), 6–24)

Note: This streak includes playoff games. Mount Union also holds the record for most consecutive regular season victories, winning 112 games between 2005–2016.

Longest unbeaten streak

60 games (59-0-1) - Augustana (IL)

Streak started September 17, 1983 (defeated  Carroll 42-14)

Streak ended November 29, 1987 (defeated by Dayton 38-36 during the D3 playoffs)

Note: This streak includes playoff games
Special Note: Linfield College holds the NCAA all-divisions record of 63 consecutive winning seasons, which began in 1956 and continues to this day.

Canadian football

Canadian Football League

Longest Winning Streak, overall

22 games – Calgary Stampeders
 Streak started August 25, 1948 (defeated Regina Roughriders 12-1)
 Streak ended October 22, 1949 (defeated by Saskatchewan Roughriders 1-10)
Note: The streak only includes the regular season.  It was also achieved back when the Stampeders played in the Western Interprovincial Football Union, which later became the Canadian Football League West Division. The CFL was not formally founded until 1958, although the records of the WIFU and the Interprovincial Rugby Football Union in Eastern Canada (forerunner to the Canadian Football League East Division) were incorporated into the league.

Longest Winning Streak, in one regular season

14 games – Calgary Stampeders
 Streak started July 21, 2016 (defeated Winnipeg Blue Bombers 33-18)
 Streak ended October 30, 2016 (defeated by Montreal Alouettes 8-17)
Note: This streak briefly held the record for the longest winning streak by a Canadian-based professional sports franchise (in contrast to the 22 game streak which was achieved as an amateur sports team). The record was eventually surpassed by the Toronto Raptors in 2020 with their winning streak that lasted 15 games.

Longest Winning Streak, home

27 games – Calgary Stampeders
 Streak started September 20, 1992 (defeated Winnipeg Blue Bombers 57-29)
 Streak ended August 18, 1995 (defeated by Birmingham Barracudas 28-31)
Note: The streak only includes the regular season.

Longest Winning Streak, away

21 games – Winnipeg Blue Bombers
 Streak started August 11, 1960 (defeated B.C. Lions 35-21)
 Streak ended September 24, 1962 (defeated by B.C. Lions 22-27)
Note: The streak only includes the regular season.

U Sports football
21 games McMaster Marauders
 Streak started September 25, 2011 (defeated Acadia Axemen 21–18)
 Streak ended November 23, 2012 (defeated by Laval Rouge et Or at the 48th Vanier Cup  14-37)

Note: The streak also includes playoff games.

IFAF World Championship
Consecutive games won

11 games – United States
 Streak started July 10, 2007 (defeated South Korea, 77-0)
 Last win July 18, 2015 (defeated Japan, 59-12)
Note: This streak is still active.

Consecutive titles won

3 Titles – United States (2007, 2011, 2015)

Indoor American football

Arena Football League
Consecutive games won (regular season and playoffs)

18 wins – Arizona Rattlers
 Streak started July 27, 2013 (defeated Iowa Barnstormers, 84-45)
 Streak ended June 27, 2014 (defeated by San Jose SaberCats, 33-62)

Note: Throughout the duration of the above streak, the Arizona Rattlers also achieved the most consecutive regular season games won (15 wins).

AF2
24 wins – Quad City Steamwheelers
 Streak started April 15, 2000 (defeated Tulsa Talons, 66–27)
 Streak ended May 12, 2001 (defeated by Tulsa Talons, 47–49)

American Indoor Football Association
Consecutive games won (regular season and playoffs)

16 wins – Baltimore Mariners
 Streak started March 6, 2010 (defeated Harrisburg Stampede, 55–48)
 Last win July 25, 2010 (defeated Wyoming Cavalry, 57-42)
Note: The streak ended during the 2010 off-season (team folded)

Consecutive regular season games won

15 wins – Baltimore Mariners
 Streak started June 27, 2009 (defeated D.C. Armor, 70–22)
 Last win June 26, 2010 (defeated Reading Express, 69-35)
Note: The streak ended during the 2010 off-season (team folded)

United Indoor Football
40 games – Sioux Falls Storm
 Streak started July 2005
 Streak ended March 29, 2008 (defeated by Omaha Beef, 18–34)

Rugby league

Representative
 Australian Kangaroos: 30 Test matches
 Queensland Maroons: 8 State of Origin series

Club
 NSWRL Premierships - St. George Dragons - 11 Premierships from 1956 to 1966 also going undefeated in the year 1959
 NSWRL Matches - Eastern Suburbs Roosters (19) - April 13, 1975 - vs. Manly-Warringah Sea Eagles to August 23, 1975 - vs. Newtown Jets
 Super League Championships - Bradford Bulls (21) -  August 24, 1996 - vs. Paris Saint-Germain Rugby League to August 22, 1997 - vs. Paris St Germain

Rugby union

Test matches
All nations
24 matches – Cyprus
 Streak began on November 29, 2008, with a 37–3 win over Azerbaijan, in Baku, Azerbaijan.
 Streak ended on November 15, 2014, with a 39–20 loss to Latvia, in Riga, Latvia.
"Tier 1" nations
18 matches – New Zealand
 Streak began on August 15, 2015, with a 41–13 win over Australia at Eden Park, Auckland, New Zealand.
 Streak ended on November 5, 2016, with a 40–29 loss to Ireland at Soldier Field, Chicago, United States.
18 matches – England
 Streak began on October 10, 2015, with a 60–3 win over Uruguay at City of Manchester Stadium, Manchester, United Kingdom.
 Streak ended on March 18, 2017, with a 13–9 loss to Ireland at Aviva Stadium, Dublin, Republic of Ireland.

Home test matches
47 consecutive matches – New Zealand
 Streak began on September 19, 2009, with a 33–6 win over Australia at Westpac Stadium, Wellington.
 Streak ended on July 1, 2017, with a 24–21 loss to the British and Irish Lions at Westpac Stadium, Wellington.

Gaelic games

All-Ireland Senior Hurling Championship
21 games – Kilkenny
 Streak started June 10, 2006
 Streak ended September 5, 2010

Golf

Men's Major Championships
4 consecutive wins – Tiger Woods
 Streak started 2000 U.S. Open
 Streak ended 2001 Masters

In 1930, Bobby Jones won the 4 major championships that he, as an amateur, was eligible to enter - the U.S. Open, the Open Championship, the British Amateur Championship and the U.S. Amateur Championship.

Woods won what is often designated an official Non-Calendar Year Grand Slam, holding all major championship trophies at one time, but not in the same year.

PGA Tour
11 wins – 1945 Byron Nelson

LPGA Tour
5 wins

1978 – Nancy Lopez

2004–2005 – Annika Sörenstam

Gymnastics

Men
8 years undefeated in All-Around competition – Kohei Uchimura
 Streak started at the 2009 World Championships
 Streak has not yet ended.
As a result of this streak, Uchimura is widely referred to as "King Kohei".

5 consecutive Men's Team all-around titles at Olympic Games – Japan
 Streak started 1960 Tokyo, Japan
 Streak ended 1980 Moscow, Soviet Union (boycotted)

Women
10 consecutive Women's Team all-around titles at Olympic Games – Soviet Union and Unified Team
 Streak started 1952 Helsinki, Finland
 Streak ended 1996 Atlanta, United States
Note: excluding boycotted Los Angeles Olympics

Handball

Olympics
3 consecutive Women's titles at Handball at the Summer Olympics
 Denmark
 Streak started 1996 Atlanta, United States
 Streak ended 2008 Beijing, China

World Championships
3 consecutive titles at World Women's Handball Championship
 Russia
 Streak started 2005 Russia
 Streak ended 2011 Brazil
 Soviet Union
 Streak started 1982 Hungary
 Streak ended 1993 Norway

Hockey

Field hockey

Olympics

Ice hockey

Olympics

World Championships
9 consecutive World Championships – Soviet Union
 Streak started 1963 Stockholm, Sweden
 Streak ended 1972 Prague, Czechoslovakia

National Hockey League
Longest winning streak by a team

17 games – Pittsburgh Penguins
 Streak started March 9, 1993 (defeated Boston Bruins, 3–2)
 Streak ended April 14, 1993 (tied New Jersey Devils, 6–6)

Note: This 6–6 tie ended the regular season. Pittsburgh won an additional three games to start the 1993 playoffs before losing for the first time in 21 games on April 25, 1993, to New Jersey, 1–4.

Longest winning streak by a goaltender in a season

14 games (tie)

– Tiny Thompson (Boston Bruins)
 Streak started December 3, 1929 (defeated Montreal Canadiens, 3-1)
 Streak ended January 12, 1930 (defeated by New York Americans, 2-3)

– Tom Barrasso (Pittsburgh Penguins)
 Streak started March 9, 1993 (defeated Boston Bruins, 3-2)
 Streak ended April 14, 1993 (tied New Jersey Devils, 6-6)

– Jonas Hiller (Anaheim Ducks)
 Streak started December 6, 2013 (defeated Chicago Blackhawks, 3-2)
 Streak ended January 17, 2014 (defeated by Chicago Blackhawks, 2-4)

– Sergei Bobrovsky (Columbus Blue Jackets)
 Streak started November 29, 2016 (defeated Tampa Bay Lightning, 5-1)
 Streak ended January 5, 2017 (defeated by Washington Capitals, 0-5)

Longest Unbeaten Streak by a team

35 Games – Philadelphia Flyers
 Streak started October 14, 1979 (defeated Toronto Maple Leafs, 4–3)
 Streak ended January 7, 1980 (defeated by Minnesota North Stars, 1–7)
Note: The 35-game stretch included 10 ties.

Longest Unbeaten Streak by a goaltender in a season

32 Games – Gerry Cheevers (Boston Bruins)
 Streak started November 14, 1971 (defeated Los Angeles Kings, 11-2)
 Streak ended March 29, 1972 (defeated by Toronto Maple Leafs, 1–4)
Note: The 32-game stretch included 8 ties.

Canadian Hockey League
Longest Winning Streak 25 games (tie):

- Kitchener Rangers (Ontario Hockey League)
 Streak started January 11, 1984
 Streak ended March 16, 1984

- Sorel Éperviers (Quebec Major Junior Hockey League)
 Streak started November 23, 1973
 Streak ended January 27, 1974

Longest Undefeated Streak 31 games – London Knights (Ontario Hockey League)
 Streak started September 23, 2004
 Streak ended December 12, 2004,
Note: The 31-game stretch included 2 ties.

American Hockey League
Consecutive Regular Season Games Won
32 games – Norfolk Admirals
 Streak started February 10, 2012 (defeated Adirondack Phantoms 2–0)
 Streak ended October 27, 2012 (defeated by St. John's IceCaps 2–3)

Consecutive Games Won (Regular Season and Playoffs)
29 games – Norfolk Admirals
 Streak started February 10, 2012 (defeated Adirondack Phantoms 2–0)
 Streak ended April 21, 2012 (defeated by Manchester Monarchs 2–5)
(Note: The Norfolk Admirals franchise had their affiliation agreement with the Tampa Bay Lightning end after the 2011–12 AHL season, losing its entire roster of players in the process. It began a new affiliation with the Anaheim Ducks and the active 28-game streak carried over into the 2012–13 season despite the change)

NCAA Women's Ice Hockey

62 games – Minnesota Golden Gophers
 Streak started February 17, 2012
 Streak ended November 17, 2013

NCAA Men's Ice Hockey

43 games – Bemidji State University
 Streak started November 8, 1983
 Streak ended January 1, 1985
 Bemidji State also holds the national collegiate records for most wins in an unbeaten season (31-0-0 in 1983–1984)

Federal Hockey League
21 games – New York Aviators
 Streak started December 31, 2010 (defeated Danbury Whalers 8–1)
 Streak ended February 25, 2011 (defeated by Danbury Whalers 1–4)

Austrian Hockey League
17 games – EC KAC
 Streak started October 8, 2010
 Streak ended December 10, 2010

Elite Ice Hockey League
22 games – Cardiff Devils
 Streak started October 30, 2010 (defeated Hull Stingrays, 7–4)
 Streak ended January 16, 2011 (defeated by Dundee Stars, 1–2)

British Columbia Hockey League
42 games – Penticton Vees
 Streak started November 11, 2011 (defeated Trail Smoke Eaters, 7–2)
 Streak ended March 10, 2012 (defeated by Prince George Spruce Kings, 2–5)

Roller Hockey

Championship A
5 consecutive gold medals at FIRS Roller Hockey World Cup – Spain
 Streak started 2005 San Jose, California, United States

Portuguese Primeira Divisão
10 consecutive Portuguese championships - Futebol Clube do Porto
 Streak started season 2001/02

Air Hockey
9 consecutive world championships – Tim Weissman
 Streak started 1989
 Streak ended 1994

30 consecutive world championships – United States
 Streak started 1978
 Streak ended 1999

Lacrosse

World Lacrosse Championship
Men's Lacrosse

38 games – United States
 Streak started June 18, 1982 (defeated Canada 23-12)
 Streak ended July 22, 2006 (defeated by Canada 10-15)

Women's Lacrosse

15 game – United States
 Streak started April 27, 1997 (defeated Wales 13-2)
 Streak ended June 26, 2005 (tied Australia 7-7)

Major League Lacrosse
14 games – Denver Outlaws
 Streak started April 27, 2013 (defeats Charlotte Hounds 21-16)
 Streak ended August 24, 2013 (defeated by Charlotte Hounds 17-14)

National Lacrosse League
22 games – Buffalo Bandits
 Streak started February 8, 1992
 Streak ended February 5, 1994

College (United States)
Pre-NCAA - Men

45 games – Navy
 Streak started 1916 (defeats Harvard 6-3)
 Streak ended May 19, 1923 (tied Syracuse 2-2)

NCAA Division I - Men

42 games – Cornell
 Streak started March 20, 1976 (defeats Adelphi)
 Streak ended May 27, 1978 (defeated by Johns Hopkins 15–8 in the National Championship)

NCAA Division I - Women

43 games – Maryland
 Streak started March 7, 2000 (defeats Towson 17-4)
 Streak ended March 1, 2002 (defeated by Duke 9-8)

NCAA Division III - Men

69 games – Salisbury
 Streak started April 17, 2003 (defeats Mary Washington 17-5)
 Streak ended May 21, 2006 (defeated by Cortland St. 13-12 (OT) in the National Championship)

NJCAA - Men

107 games – Onondaga
 Streak started March 30, 2010 (defeats Broome 19-2)
 Streak ended March 12, 2016 (defeated by Nassau 10-9)

Men's Collegiate Lacrosse Association

33 games – Sonoma State University
 Streak started February 2002
 Streak ended April 2003

High School (United States)
Boys

91 games – Sewanhaka High School
 Streak started 1948
 Streak ended 1957

91 games – West Genesee High School
 Streak started 1981
 Streak ended 1984

Girls

198 games – McDonogh School
 Streak started April 13, 2009 (defeats Winters Mill 15-3)
 Streak ended May 11, 2018 (defeated by Notre Dame Prep 10-8)

Marbles
12 consecutive titles at British and World Marbles Championship – Toucon Terribles
 Streak started 1964 West Sussex, England
 Streak ended 1976 West Sussex, England

Mind sports

Chess
25 games – Wilhelm Steinitz
 Streak started 1873
 Streak ended 1882

Memory
3 consecutive titles at the World Memory Championship
 Dominic O'Brien
 Streak started 1999 London, England
 Streak ended 2002 London, England
 Dominic O'Brien
 Streak started 1995 London, England
 Streak ended 1998 London, England

Pentamind
4 consecutive titles at the Mind Sports Olympiad – Demis Hassabis
 Streak started 1998 London, England
 Streak ended 2002 Loughborough, England

Motorcycle sports

Road racing

Grand Prix motorcycle racing 
List of MotoGP rider records

Superbike World Championship 
5 consecutive titles – Jonathan Rea
 Streak started 2015

FIM Endurance World Championship 
4 consecutive titles –
  (as European Championship)
 Streak started 1976
 Streak ended 1980

From 2001, title was given to teams
 
 Streak started 2005
 Streak ended 2008
 Streak started 2010
 Streak ended 2013

Motocross

Motocross World Championship 
6 consecutive titles – Stefan Everts
 Streak started 2001
 Streak ended 2007 (retired)

Motocross des Nations 
14 consecutive titles – United States
 Streak started 1981
 Streak ended 1994

5 consecutive titles –

David Bailey
 Streak started 1982
 Streak ended 1987 (did not participate due to injuries)

Gautier Paulin
 Streak started 2014
 Streak ended 2019

AMA Motocross Championship 
10 consecutive titles – Ricky Carmichael
 Streak started 1997, in 125 cc
 Moved up to 250 cc starting from 2000 onwards
 Streak ended 2006, competed on a partial season

AMA Supercross Championship 
10 consecutive titles – Jeremy McGrath
 Streak started 1991 in 125 cc
 Moved up to 250 cc starting from 1993 onwards
 Streak ended 1996

Motorcycle trials

FIM Trial World Championship

Outdoor Series 
13 consecutive titles – Toni Bou
 Streak started 2007

Indoor Series 
13 consecutive titles – Toni Bou
 Streak started 2007

Women's 
7 consecutive titles –  Laia Sanz
 Streak started 2000
 Streak ended 2007

Racquet sports

Badminton

Men's

Singles
7 consecutive titles at World Championships – China
 Streak started 2006 Madrid, Spain

Doubles
3 consecutive titles at World Championships
 China
 Streak started 2009 Hyderabad, India
 Streak ended 2013 Guangzhou, China
 Indonesia
 Streak started 1993 Birmingham, England
 Streak ended 1999 Copenhagen, Denmark

Team
5 consecutive titles at the World Team Championships
 China
 Streak started 2004 Jakarta, Indonesia
 Indonesia
 Streak started 1994 Jakarta, Indonesia
 Streak ended 2004 Jakarta, Indonesia

Women's

Singles
8 consecutive titles at World Championships – China
 Streak started 2001 Seville, Spain
 Streak ended 2013 Guangzhou, China

Doubles
11 consecutive titles at World Championships – China
 Streak started 1997 Glasgow, United Kingdom

5 consecutive titles at Olympic Games – China
 Streak started 1996 Atlanta, United States

Team
6 consecutive titles at the World Team Championships – China
 Streak started 1998 Hong Kong, China
 Streak ended 2010 Kuala Lumpur, Malaysia

Racquetball

Men's
137 matches – Kane Waselenchuk
 Streak started January 2009
 Streak ended January 15, 2012 (defeated by Rocky Carson)

Women's
152 matches, 37 tournaments - Paola Longoria
 Streak started May 1, 2011
 Streak ended October 19, 2014

Squash
555 matches – Jahangir Khan
 Streak started 1981 (defeated Geoff Hunt)
 Streak ended 1986 (defeated by Ross Norman)

Note: This is the longest winning streak in sports history (in number of wins).

NB: Heather McKay (Australia) may hold a claim to having the longest winning streak as she went unbeaten for 19 years (1962–1981)

College teams (USA)

252 team meets – Trinity College Bantams Squash Team
 Streak started February 1998
 Streak ended January 18, 2012 (defeated by Yale)

Considered the longest winning streak in the history of varsity intercollegiate sports in the United States.

Table Tennis

Men's

Singles
4 consecutive titles at World Championships – Viktor Barna
 Streak started 1932 Prague, Czechoslovakia
 Streak ended 1936 Prague, Czechoslovakia

6 consecutive titles at World Championships – Hungary
 Streak started 1930, Berlin, Germany
 Streak ended 1936 Prague, Czechoslovakia

Doubles
10 consecutive titles at World Championships – China
 Streak started 1993 Gothenburg, Sweden
 Streak ended 2013 Paris, France

5 consecutive titles at Olympic Games – China
 Streak started 1988 Seoul, South Korea (Inaugural Competition)
Notes: The doubles events were replaced by team events in 2008 Beijing Olympics.

Team
6 consecutive titles at World Championships – China
 Streak started 2001 Osaka, Japan

3 consecutive titles at Olympic Games – China
 Streak started 2008 Beijing, China (Inaugural Competition)

Women's

Singles
6 consecutive titles at World Championships – Angelica Rozeanu
 Streak started 1950 Budapest, Hungary
 Streak ended 1956 Tokyo, Japan
8 consecutive titles at Olympic Games – China
 Streak started 1988 Seoul, South Korea (Inaugural Competition)

10 consecutive titles at World Championships – China
 Streak started 1995, Tianjin, China

Doubles
6 consecutive titles at World Championships – Mária Mednyánszky and Anna Sipos
 Streak started 1930 Berlin, Germany
 Streak ended 1936 Prague, Czechoslovakia
13 consecutive titles at World Championships – China
 Streak started 1989, Dortmund, Germany

4 consecutive titles at Olympic Games – China
 Streak started 1992 Barcelona, Spain
Notes: The doubles events were replaced by team events in 2008 Beijing Olympics.

Team
8 consecutive titles at World Championships – China
 Streak started 1993 Gothenburg, Sweden
 Streak ended 2010 Moscow, Russia

2 consecutive titles at Olympic Games – China
 Streak started 2008 Beijing, China (Inaugural Competition)

Mixed doubles
11 consecutive titles at World Championships – China
 Streak started 1991 Chiba City, Japan
 Streak ended 2013 Paris, France

Tennis

Top level amateur
182 matches – Suzanne Lenglen
 Streak started after August 19, 1921 (withdrew with whooping cough during match to Molla Mallory at the 1921 U.S. National Championships)
 Streak ended May 1926 (withdrew from 1926 Wimbledon Championships after missing the opening of a third-round match)
The withdrawal in the match to Mallory in 1921 ended a 112-match winning streak.

Between 1919 and 1938 Helen Wills Moody amassed a 398–35 match record, including a winning streak of at least 158 matches, during which she did not lose a set.

Professional

Men

Most consecutive game wins
25 games - 1993 Sergi Bruguera

Overall consecutive set wins
39 sets - 1980 Björn Borg

Single Tournament set wins
41 sets - Björn Borg, French Open
 Streak started in 1979
 Streak ended in 1981

Overall Consecutive match wins
46 matches – Guillermo Vilas (Open era record) Vilas won his 46 consecutive matches all on clay courts.
 Streak started July 11, 1977 (defeated Alvin Gardener in Kitzbühel)
 Streak ended October 1, 1977 (defeated by Ilie Năstase in Aix en Provence)

Consecutive match wins only on one surface

Clay courts
81 matches – Rafael Nadal

Grass courts
65 matches – Roger Federer

Hard courts
56 matches – Roger Federer

Indoor courts
66 matches – Ivan Lendl

Women

74 matches – Martina Navratilova
 Streak started February 1984 (defeated Nancy Yeargin)
 Streak ended December 1984 (defeated by Helena Suková)

Note: Chris Evert currently holds the record for the longest winning streak on clay courts (125 matches), that is also the longest winning streak on single surface (male or female).

10 consecutive US Open women's doubles titles – Margaret Osborne duPont
 Streak started 1941
 Streak ended 1951

Wheelchair

470 matches – Esther Vergeer
 Streak started January 30, 2003
 Last win September 2012
Note: The streak ended on February 12, 2013, when Vergeer retired from wheelchair tennis with her winning streak intact.

College (USA)

NCAA Men's Team
137 Matches – University of Miami
 Streak started 1957 after loss to Presbyterian, March 23, 1957
 Streak ended April 3, 1964, with 5–4 loss to Princeton
(Note: Miami had won 72 consecutive matches prior to the streak and had a 59 match streak before that. Between 1949 and 1964, Miami won 268 of 270 matches)

Home Winning Streak – Ohio State University
 Streak started on April 5, 2003.  Currently 200 matches.

NCAA Women's Team
89 Matches – Stanford University
 Streak started 2003
 Streak ended 2007

Radio-controlled racing

1:12 electric track

IFMAR 1:12 Electric Track World Championship 
6 consecutive wins by car –
 Team Associated RC12
 Streak started 1982 ended 1994

3 consecutive wins by driver –
 Masami Hirosaka
 Streak started 2000 ended 2006 (chose not to defend title)
 Naoto Matsukura
 Streak started 2008 ended 2014

EFRA 1:12 Electric Track European Championship 
7 consecutive wins by driver –
 Alexander Hagberg
 Streak started 2014

JMRCA All-Japan 1:12 EP Racing Car Open National Championship 
7 consecutive wins by driver –
 Naoto Matsukura
 Streak started 2007 ended 2014

1:10 electric touring

IFMAR ISTC World Championship 
3 consecutive wins by car –
 Tamiya TRF41x series
 Streak started 2008 ended 2014

1:10 electric off-road

IFMAR 1:10 Electric Off-Road World Championship 
5 consecutive wins by car –
 Team Associated RC10
 2WD: Streak started 2003 ended 2013
 Yokomo
 4WD: Streak started 1989 ended 1999

ROAR 1:10 Electric Off-Road National Championship 
8 consecutive wins by car (4WD) –
 Team Losi
 Streak started 1996 ended 2005

4 consecutive wins by driver and car (2WD) –
 Team Losi XX
 Streak started 1994 ended 1998
 Brian Kinwald and Team Losi XXX
 Streak started 1999 ended 2003
 Ryan Cavalieri and Team Associated RC10B4
 Streak started 2006 ended 2010

EFRA 1:10 Electric Off-Road European Championship 
5 consecutive wins by driver (4WD) –
 Jukka Steenari
 Streak started 1996 ended 2001

4 consecutive wins by car (4WD) –
 Schumacher CAT 2000
 Streak started 1994 ended 1998

4 consecutive wins by driver and car (2WD) –
 Craig Drescher and Team Associated RC10
 Streak started 1991 ended 1994
 Neil Cragg and Team Associated RC10
 Streak started 2002 ended 2006

JMRCA All-Japan 1:10 EP Off-Road Car National Championship 
9 consecutive wins by driver (4WD) –
 Masami Hirosaka
 Streak started 1991 ended 1999

7 consecutive wins by driver (2WD) –
 Masami Hirosaka
 Streak started 1987 ended 1993

22 consecutive wins by car (2WD) –
 Team Associated RC10
 Streak started 1987 ended 2009

13 consecutive wins by car (4WD) –
 Yokomo
 Streak started 1991 ended 2004

1:8 off-road

IFMAR 1:8 IC Off-Road World Championship 
6 consecutive wins by car –
 Kyosho Inferno
 Streak started 1992 ended 2004

EFRA 1:8 IC Off-Road European Championship 
3 consecutive wins by driver –
 
 Streak started 2008 ended 2011

4 consecutive wins by car –
 Mugen Seiki MBX series
 Streak started 2008 ended 2012
 Kyosho Inferno MP9 TKIx series
 Streak started 2013 ended 2017

ROAR 1:8 Fuel Off-Road National Championship 
4 consecutive wins by car –
 Kyosho Inferno MP7.5
 Streak started 2000 ended 2003

BRCA Rallycross National Championship 
5 consecutive wins by driver and car –
 David Crompton and Radiosistemi Crono
 Streak started 1999 ended 2004

Campeonato de España a 1:8 Todo Terreno Gas 
13 consecutive wins by driver –
 Robert Batlle
 Streak started 2006 ended 2019

JMRCA All-Japan 1:8 GP Off-Road Championship 
7 consecutive wins by car –
 Kyosho Inferno
 Streak started 1996 ended 2003

1:8 IC track

IFMAR 1:8 IC Track World Championship 
8 consecutive wins by engine –
 Novarossi (and its own brands)
 Streak started 1987 ended 2003

5 consecutive wins by driver –
 Lamberto Collari
 Streak started 1989 ended 1999

4 consecutive wins by car –
 Kyosho Evolva
 Streak started 2003 ended 2011 (achieved by Collari)

Rodeo
8 consecutive PRCA World All-Around Champion titles at the National Finals Rodeo – Trevor Brazile
 Streak started 2006 Las Vegas, Nevada, United States

Bull Riding 
 309 buckoffs- PRCA Red Rock
 Streak started 1979 ended 1988
 42 buckoffs- PBR Bushwacker
 Streak started 2009 ended 2013
 24 connective qualified rides-Silvano Alves
 Streak started 2014 ended 2015

Tennis
 Longest winning streak (male or female) in Tennis is 181 matches. It is held by French tennis player Suzanne Lenglen.
 Longest winning streak in Open Era is 74 matches, held by US tennis player Martina Navratilova.
 Longest winning streak in men's tennis in Open Era is Novak Djokovic's 46 matches.

Volleyball

Beach volleyball
112 match wins, 19 tournament wins – Misty May-Treanor and Kerri Walsh, United States
 Streak started August 24, 2007 (defeated Ania Ruiz and Yarleen Santiago; 21–11, 21-9)
 Streak ended August 31, 2008 (defeated by Elaine Youngs and Nicole Branagh; 19–21, 21–10, 23-25)

3 consecutive gold medals at Olympic Games – Misty May-Treanor and Kerri Walsh
 Streak started 2004 Athens, Greece
 Streak ended 2016 Rio, Brazil (May-Treanor retired, Walsh (with April Ross) defeated by Ágatha Bednarczuk and Bárbara Seixas)

Indoor Volleyball

Men's
3 consecutive gold medals at FIVB Volleyball World Championship
 Brazil
 Streak started 2002 Argentina
 Streak ended 2014 Poland
 Italy
 Streak started 1990 Brazil
 Streak ended 2002 Argentina

Women's
3 consecutive gold medals at FIVB Volleyball World Championship – Soviet Union
 Streak started 1952 Soviet Union
 Streak ended 1962 Soviet Union

4 consecutive gold medals at FIVB Volleyball World Cup – Cuba
 Streak started 1989 Japan
 Streak ended 2003 Japan

3 consecutive gold medals at Summer Olympics – Cuba
 Streak started 1992 Barcelona, Spain
 Streak ended 2004 Athens, Greece

College Volleyball (USA)

Division I
109 matches – Penn State women's volleyball
 Streak started September 21, 2007
 Streak ended September 11, 2010 (defeated by Stanford; 26–28, 12–25, 18–25 in Gainesville, Florida)

Note: winner of 4 consecutive NCAA championships (2007–2010)

Division II
75 matches – Concordia University, Saint Paul women's volleyball
 Streak started August 29, 2008 (defeated UC San Diego in 3–1 win)
 Streak ended September 3, 2010 (defeated by Grand Valley State in 0–3 loss)

Note: winner of 6 consecutive NCAA championships (2007–2012)

Beach
103 matches – Sara Hughes and Kelly Claes, USC Trojans beach volleyball
 Streak started April 2, 2015
 Streak ended April 8, 2017 (defeated by Lindsey Knudsen and Payton Rund, Saint Mary's Gaels; 21–13, 18–21, 15-17)

Weightlifting

World Championships
8 consecutive titles at World Championships – Vasiliy Alekseyev
 Streak started 1970 Columbus, USA
 Streak ended 1978 Gettysburg, USA

Winter Sports

Biathlon
8 consecutive women's relay World Championships – USSR
 Streak started 1984 Chamonix, France
 Streak ended 1993 Borovets, Bulgaria

Curling

Men's team
6 consecutive gold medals at World Curling Championships – Canada
 Streak started 1959 Falkirk, Perth & Edinburgh, Scotland
 Streak ended 1965 Perth, Scotland

3 consecutive gold medals at Winter Olympics – Canada
 Streak started 2006 Turin, Italy

Women's team
4 consecutive gold medals at World Curling Championships – Canada
 Streak started 1984 Perth, Scotland
 Streak ended 1988 Glasgow, Scotland

Figure skating

Ladies
10 consecutive titles at World Figure Skating Championships – Sonja Henie
 Streak started 1927 Oslo, Norway
 Streak ended 1937 London, England

Pairs
10 consecutive titles at World Figure Skating Championships – Irina Rodnina
 Streak started 1969 Colorado Springs, USA
 Streak ended 1979 Vienna, Austria – won by Tai Babilonia and Randy Gardner

Note: winner of three consecutive Olympic titles from 1972 to 1980

10 consecutive titles at European Figure Skating Championships – Irina Rodnina
 Streak started 1969 Garmisch-Partenkirchen, West Germany
 Streak ended 1979 Zagreb, Yugoslavia – won by Marina Cherkasova and Sergei Shakhrai

12 consecutive Olympic titles – USSR, Unified Team and Russia
 Streak started 1964 Innsbruck, Austria – Ludmila Belousova and Oleg Protopopov
 Streak ended 2010 Vancouver, Canada – won by Shen Xue and Zhao Hongbo
Note: this streak includes a win reduced to a draw after the 2002 Olympics.

14 consecutive titles at World Figure Skating Championships – USSR
 Streak started 1965 Colorado Springs, USA
 Streak ended 1979 Vienna, Austria
17 consecutive titles at European Figure Skating Championships – USSR
 Streak started 1965 Moscow, USSR
 Streak ended 1982 Lyon, France

Luge

Men's Single
3 consecutive men's singles World Championships – Germany
 Streak started 2007 Igls, Austria
 Streak ended 2011 Cesana, Italy

Women's team
105 consecutive women's World Cup races – Germany
 Streak started December 6, 1997, Igls, Austria
 Streak ended February 12, 2011, Paramonovo, Russia

Women's Single
11 consecutive women's singles World Championships – Germany
 Streak started 1995 Lillehammer, Norway
 Streak ended 2009 Lake Placid, United States

Doubles
5 consecutive double's World Championships – East Germany
 Streak started 1981 Hammarstrand, Sweden
 Streak ended 1990 Calgary, Alberta, Canada

Mixed Team Relay
10 consecutive mixed team relay World Championships – Germany
 Streak started 2000 St. Moritz, Switzerland

Skiing

Alpine skiing

Alpine Skiing Combined

Women's
3 consecutive gold medals at Winter Olympics – Austria
 Streak started 1948 St. Moritz, Switzerland
 Streak ended 1992 Albertville, France

Downhill

Women's
11 consecutive wins in FIS World Cup – Annemarie Moser-Pröll, Austria
 Streak started December 1972
 Streak ended January 1974

Giant Slalom

Men's
14 consecutive wins in FIS World Cup – Ingemar Stenmark, Sweden
 Streak started March 18, 1978
 Streak ended January 21, 1980 

3 consecutive gold medals at Winter Olympics – Austria
 Streak started 1998 Nagano, Japan
 Streak ended 2010 Vancouver, Canada

Slalom

Men's
4 consecutive gold medals at Winter Olympics – Austria
 Streak started 1952 Oslo, Norway
 Streak ended 1968 Grenoble, France

Super-G

Men's
4 consecutive gold medals at Winter Olympics – Norway
 Streak started 2002 Salt Lake City, United States

Women's
3 consecutive gold medals at Winter Olympics – Austria
 Streak started 2006 Turin, Italy

Freestyle skiing
16 consecutive wins in FIS World Cup moguls skiing (individual and dual moguls) – Hannah Kearney, United States
 Streak started January 22, 2011, Lake Placid, United States
 Streak ended February 19, 2012, by Audrey Robichaud

Speed skating

Long track
53 consecutive 5000 m races – Hjallis Andersen
 Streak started March 19, 1949 Tromsø, Norway
 Streak ended January 2, 1954 Bislett Stadion in Oslo, Norway (fall)

15 consecutive 10000m World Championships – Netherlands
 Streak started 1996 by Gianni Romme in Hamar, Norway (first time contested)
 Last win 2013 by Jorrit Bergsma in Sochi, Russia

9 consecutive men's all-round World Championships – Netherlands
 Streak started 1995 by Rintje Ritsma in Baselga di Pinè, Italy
 Streak ended 2004 by Chad Hedrick in Hamar, Norway

4 consecutive men's all-round World Championships – Sven Kramer (twice)
 Streak started 2007 Heerenveen, Netherlands
 Streak ended 2011 Calgary, Canada (Kramer did not participate due to injury)
 Kramer also won the 2012, 2013, 2015, 2016 and 2017 championships.

15 consecutive women's all-round World Championships – Soviet Union
 Streak started 1952 by Khalida Shchegoleyeva in Kokkola, Finland
 Streak ended 1967 by Stien Kaiser in Deventer, Netherlands

5 consecutive women's all-round World Championships – Gunda Niemann-Stirnemann
 Streak started 1995 Savalen, Norway
 Streak ended 2000 by Claudia Pechstein in Milwaukee, United States
 Niemann-Stirnemann also won the championships from 1991 to 1993.

Short track
5 consecutive titles at World Championships – Viktor Ahn
 Streak started 2003 Warsaw, Poland Columbus, USA
 Streak ended 2008 Gangneung, South Korea

83 consecutive world cup, world championship, and Olympic 500 m races  – Wang Meng
 Streak started September 30, 2005 Hangzhou, China
 Streak ended February 8, 2009 Sofia, Bulgaria (fall in semifinals)
Note: Wang Meng also has the longest Short Track Speed Skating World Cup winning streak with six wins on the 500 m between 2005 and 2010

See also
 Losing streak
 Perfect season

References

Sports terminology
 
Terminology used in multiple sports